= List of fauna of the Lower Colorado River Valley =

This is a list of fauna of the Lower Colorado River Valley in the southwestern United States.

== Birds ==
- Abert's towhee
- Ash-throated flycatcher
- Bell's vireo
- Black rail
- Black-tailed gnatcatcher
- Black-throated sparrow
- Blue grosbeak
- Brown-crested flycatcher
- Brown-headed cowbird
- Cactus wren
- Crissal thrasher
- Curve-billed thrasher
- Gambel's quail
- Gila woodpecker
- Gilded flicker
- Greater roadrunner
- Greater sandhill crane
- House finch
- Killdeer
- Ladder-backed woodpecker
- Le Conte's thrasher
- Lesser nighthawk
- Loggerhead shrike
- Lucy's warbler
- Mourning dove
- Northern flicker
- Phainopepla
- Ridgway's rail
- Song sparrow
- Summer Tanager
- Verdin
- Vermilion flycatcher
- Western kingbird
- Yellow-breasted chat
- Yellow-headed blackbird
- Yellow warbler

== Insects/arthropods/etc. ==
- Africanized bee
- Velvet ant
- Scorpion
- Tarantula
- Tarantula hawk, a spider wasp

== Lepidoptera ==
- Yucca moth

== Mammals ==
- Black-tailed jackrabbit
- Bobcat
- Collared peccary
- Cotton rat
- Cougar, puma or mountain lion
- Desert bighorn sheep
- Desert woodrat
- Groundhog
- Kit fox
- Mule deer
- Muskrat
- Pack rat
- Pronghorn

== Lizards ==
- Chuckwalla
- Common collared lizard
- Common side-blotched lizard
- Desert horned lizard
- Desert iguana–(?)
- Five-lined skink
- Fringe-toed lizard
- Gecko
- Granite spiny lizard
- Western fence lizard

== Snakes ==
- Arizona mountain king snake
- California kingsnake
- Colorado Desert sidewinder
- Desert kingsnake
- Garter snake
- Mojave Desert sidewinder
- Mojave rattlesnake
- Racer
- Rosy boa
- Western diamondback rattlesnake

== Tortoises ==
- Desert tortoise

== Gallery ==
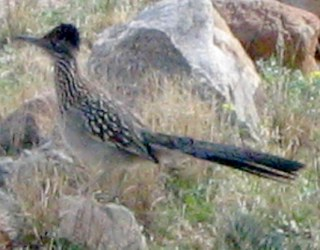
Greater roadrunner

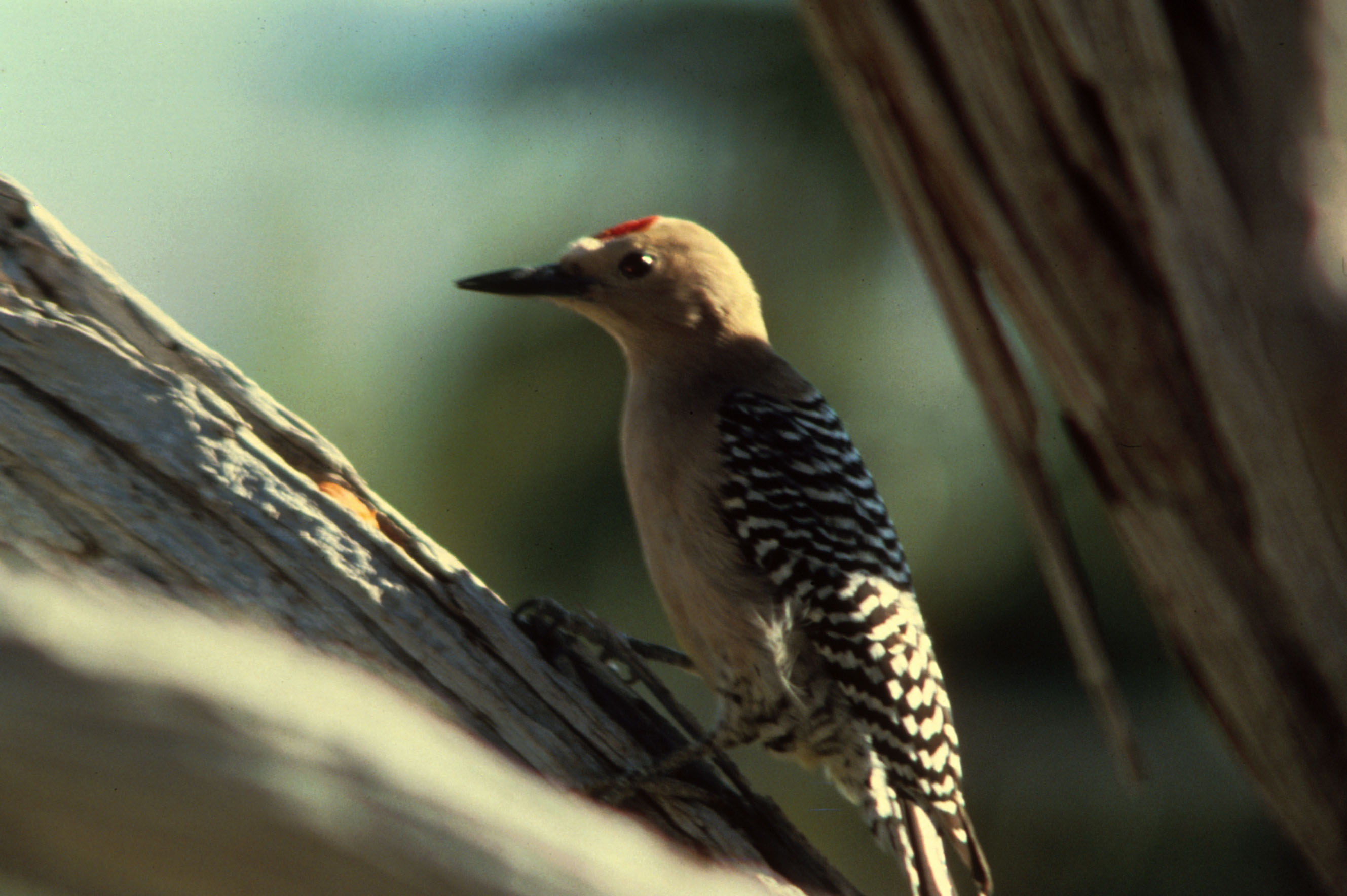
Gila woodpecker
Melanerpes uropygialis

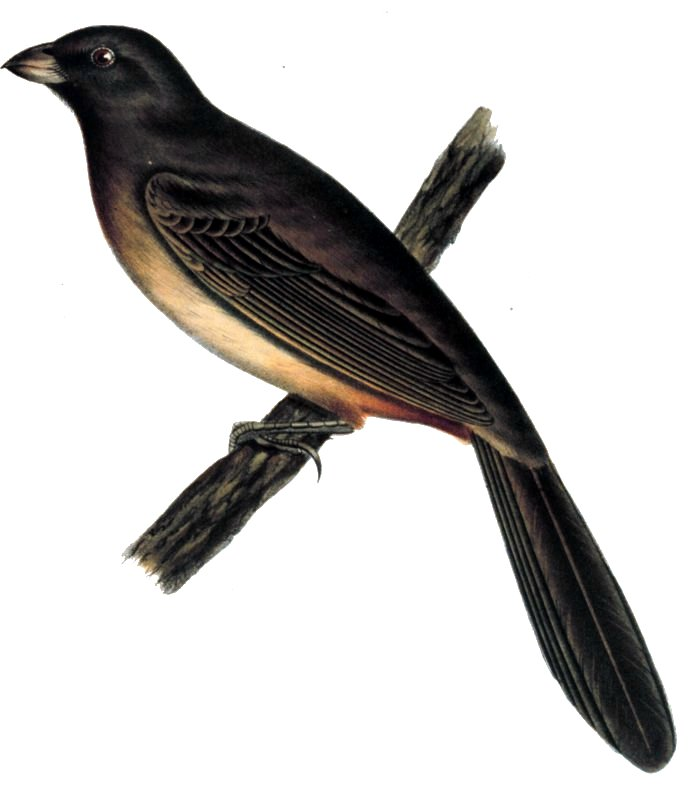
Abert's towhee
Pipilo aberti

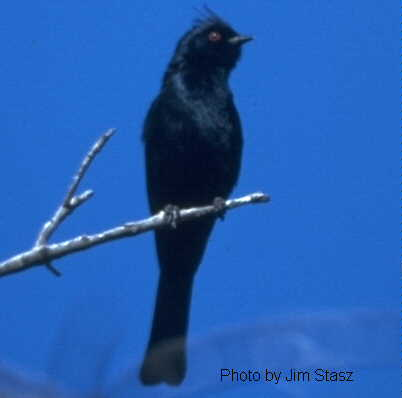
Phainopepla
Phainopepla nitens

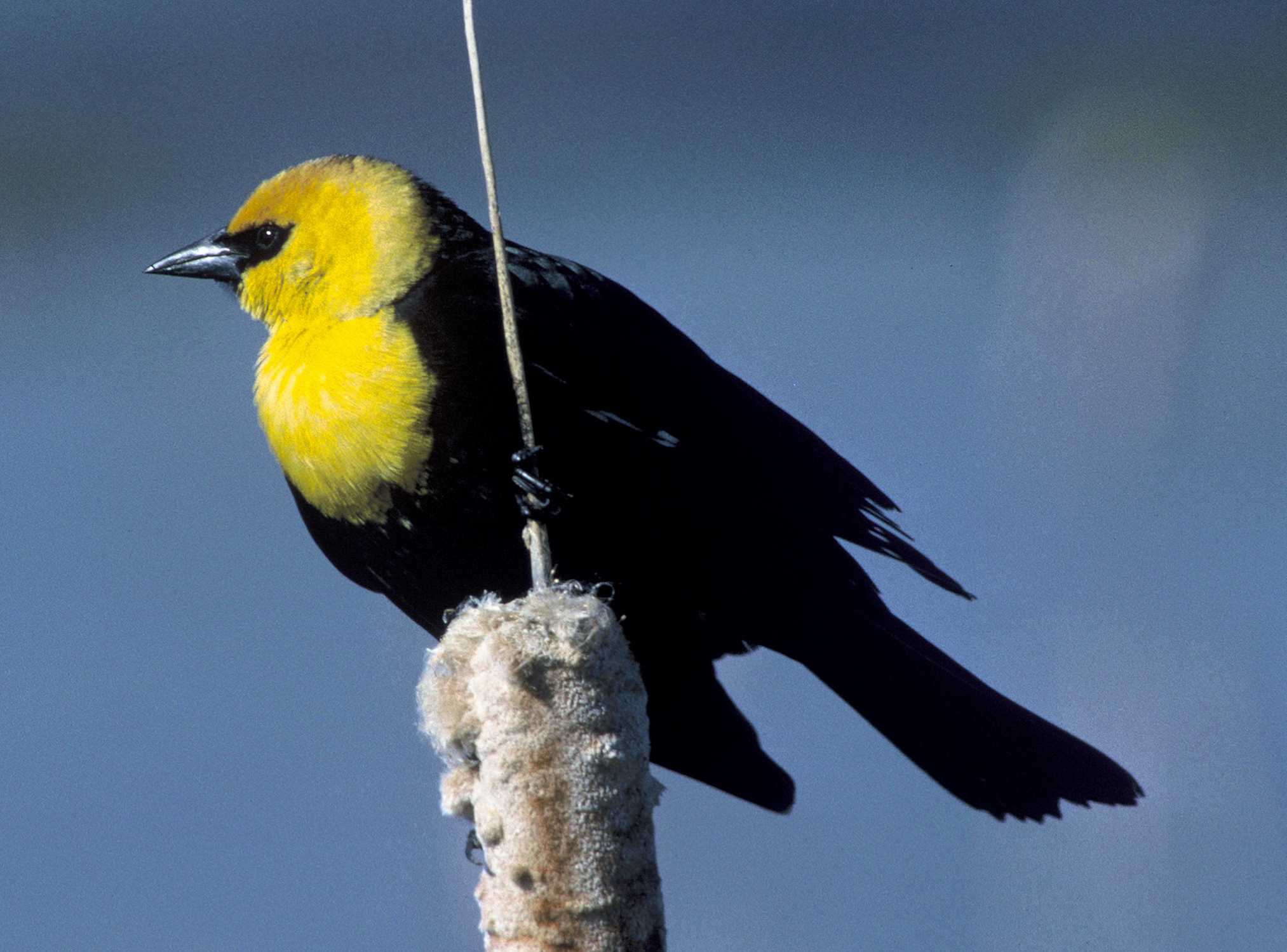
Yellow-headed
blackbird
Xanthocephalus
xanthocephalus

== See also ==
- Fauna of the Sonoran Desert
- List of Sonoran Desert birds (Arizona)
