= Snake-arm robot =

A snake-arm robot is a slender hyper-redundant manipulator. The high number of degrees of freedom allows the arm to “snake” along a path or around an obstacle – hence the name “snake-arm”.

== Definition ==
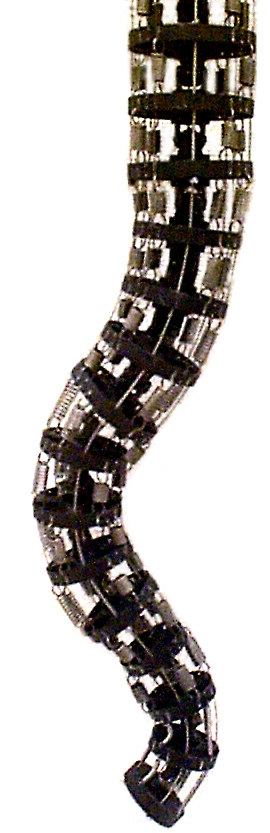
Elephant Trunk robotic arm

Snake-arm robots are also described as continuum robots and elephant's trunk robots although these descriptions are restrictive in their definitions and cannot be applied to all snake-arm robots.

- A continuum robot is a continuously curving manipulator, much like the arm of an octopus.
- An elephant's trunk robot is a good descriptor of a continuum robot. This has generally been associated with whole arm manipulation – where the entire arm is used to grasp and manipulate objects, in the same way that an elephant would pick up a ball.

This is an emerging field and as such there is no agreement on the best term for this class of robot.

Snake-arm robots are often used in association with another device. The function of the other device is to introduce the snake-arm into the confined space. Examples of possible introduction axes include mounting a snake-arm on a remote controlled vehicle or an industrial robot or designing a bespoke a linear actuator. In this case the shape of the arm is coordinated with the linear movement of the introduction axis enabling the arm to follow a path into confined spaces.

Other features which are usually (but not always) associated with snake-arm robots:

- Continuous diameter along the length of the arm
- Self-supporting
- Either tendon-driven or pneumatically controlled in most cases.

A snake-arm robot is not to be confused with a snakebot which mimics the biomorphic motion of a snake in order to slither along the ground.

== Applications ==
The ability to reach into confined spaces lends itself to many applications involving access problems. The list below is not intended to be an exhaustive list of possibilities but merely an indication of where these robots are being used or developed for use.

=== Industry ===
- Nuclear
  - Decommissioning
  - Repair and maintenance
- Aerospace
  - Manufacture and assembly: inside wing boxes, jet engines and ducts.
  - Surface Preparation: wielding pneumatic sanders for all stages of surface finishing prior to final paint application.
  - Maintenance, Repair and Overhaul
- Automotive
  - Manufacture: Snake-arm robots allow structures to be assembled in a different way.

=== Security and defence ===
- Bomb disposal and counter terrorism
- Search and rescue

=== Robotic surgery ===
- Endoscopy
- Colonoscopy
- Neurosurgery

== History of Snake-arm robots ==
- Tensor arm manipulator, invented in 1968 by V.C. Anderson, commonly called the Scripps Tensor Arm, is a spine-like elephant trunk arm. Control is via a large number nylon microfilaments.
- ANAT (Articulated Nimble Adaptable Trunk) AMI-100, invented in 1997 by Charles Khairallah, is a modular hyper-redundant snake-like industrial robot arm.
- OC Robotics, a British company founded in 1997 is one of the worlds leading manufacturers of wire driven snake arm technologies.
- Temple Allen Industries, a US company founded in 2003, makes cable-driven EMMA (Easily Manipulated Mechanical Arm) systems, some of which are robotic and some of which are entirely pneumatic. The majority of their customer are aerospace companies.
