= Snakebot =

Snake-like robot

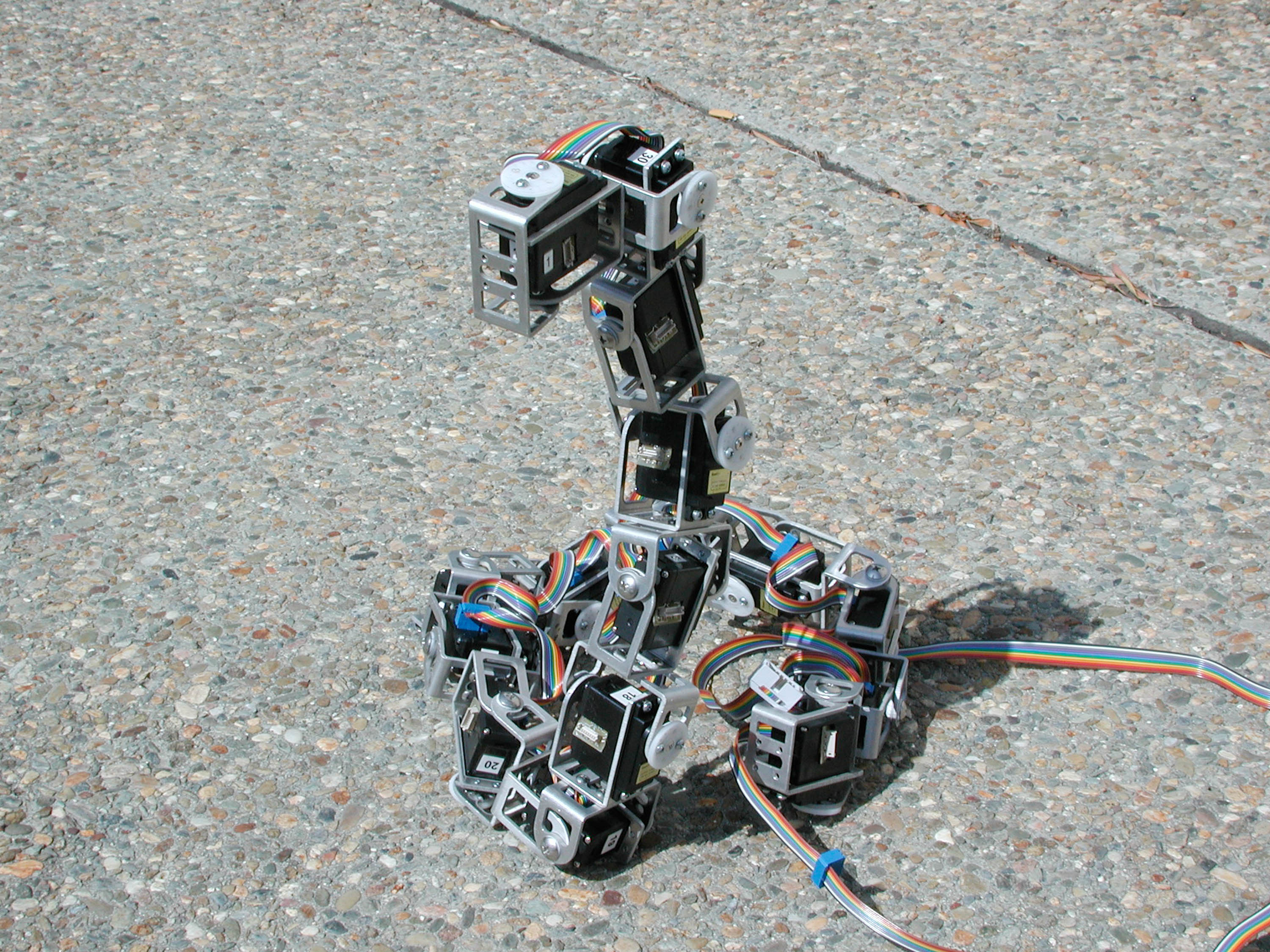
A Gen 2 Snakebot from NASA, demonstrating rearing capabilities.

A snakebot, also referred to as a snake robot, is a biomorphic robot that resembles a snake. Snakebots have uses similar to those of certain types of soft robots.

Snakebots can vary significantly in size and design. Their small cross-section-to-length ratios allow them to maneuver through tight spaces. Their ability to change shape allows them to traverse varied terrain.

Snake robots are often designed by connecting multiple independent segments, which provides redundancy and enables continued operation even if some parts are damaged. Snakebots have been posited for a range of practical applications.

A snakebot differs from a snake-arm robot in that, snakebots are usually self-contained, whereas snake-arm robots typically have mechanics remote from the arm itself, possibly connected to a larger system.

== Applications ==
By mimicking the locomotion of snakes, snakebots can be used for tasks in multiple industries that traditional robots or human workers may find challenging or impossible to accomplish safely. Snakebots have been considered for the following applications:

- Search and rescue: A snakebot was deployed for search and rescue after the September 2017 earthquake in Mexico City.
- Inspection and maintenance: These robots can also be used for inspecting hard-to-reach areas, such as tubes, pipelines, bridges, and other infrastructure elements.
- Medical applications: In medical technology, miniature versions of Snakebots have been developed for endoscopic and minimally invasive procedures. An example is the medical snakebot developed at Carnegie Mellon University, which is capable of maneuvering around organs inside a human chest cavity.
- Military and surveillance: Due to their quiet, agile movement, snakebots are being considered for reconnaissance and surveillance tasks in military and defense settings.
- Space exploration: Space agencies are exploring the use of snakebots to navigate extraterrestrial terrains, such as the rocky, uneven surfaces of Mars or the Moon, including steep craters. Unlike traditional rovers, which can get stuck on uneven ground, snakebots can adapt to challenging terrains, slithering over rocks or squeezing into crevices to gather data in places otherwise inaccessible. An example is the Exobiology Extant Life Surveyor designed to explore the surface and the oceans of Enceladus, a moon of Saturn.

== Locomotion ==
Traditional Snakebots move by changing the shape of their body, similar to actual snakes. Many variants have been created that use wheels or treads for movement. There have yet to be any Snakebots that accurately approximate the locomotion of real snakes. However, researchers have produced new movement methods that do not occur in nature, such as switching between slithering and rolling locomotion based on surface type.

In snakebot research, a gait is a periodic mode of locomotion/movement. Sidewinding and lateral undulation are both examples of gaits. Snakebot gaits are often designed by investigating periodic changes to the shape of the robot. For example, a caterpillar moves by changing the shape of its body to match a sinusoidal wave. Similarly, a snakebot can move by adapting its shape to different periodic functions.

Sidewinder rattlesnakes can ascend sandy slopes by increasing the portion of their bodies in contact with the sand to match the reduced yielding force of the inclined sand, allowing them to ascend the maximum possible sand slope without slipping. Snakebots that side-wind can replicate this ascent.

== Current research ==
Snakebots are currently being researched as a new type of robotic, interplanetary probe by engineers at the NASA Ames Research Center. Software for snakebots is also being developed by NASA, so that they can learn by experiencing the skills to scale obstacles and remembering the techniques.

Snake robots are also being developed for search and rescue purposes at Carnegie Mellon University's Biorobotics Lab.

== See also ==
- Snake-arm robot
- Roboboa
- Bio-inspired robotics § Limbless locomotion
