= Exobiology Extant Life Surveyor =

Jet Propulsion Laboratory Conceptual Probe

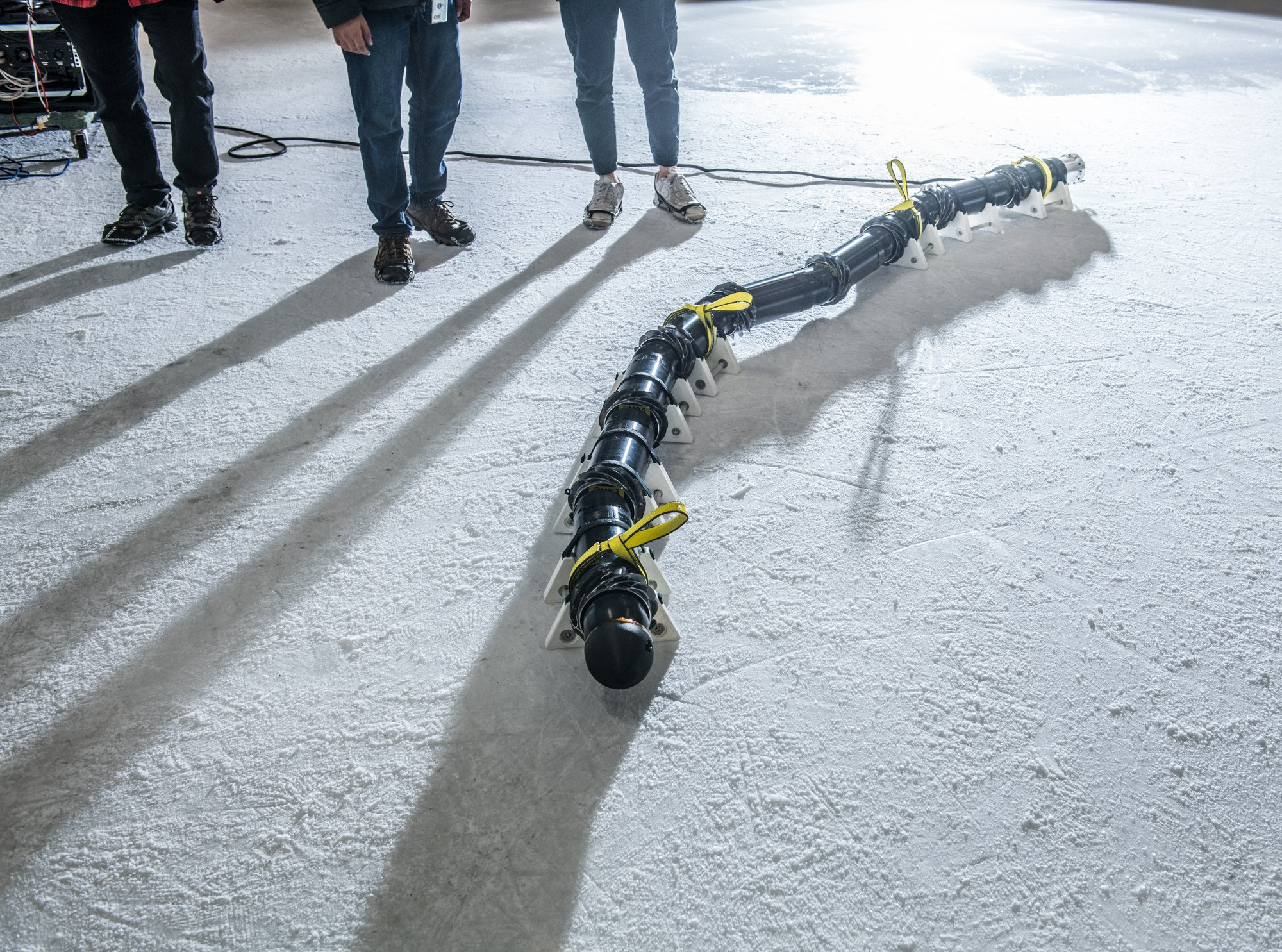
- Version 1.0 on ice rink (Courtesy NASA/JPL-Caltech)
- Owner: Jet Propulsion Laboratory
- Manufacturer: Jet Propulsion Laboratory

Specifications
- Dimensions: 4 m (13 ft) long
- Dry mass: 100 kg (220 lb)

Exobiology Extant Life Surveyor, (also called EELS) is a snakebot vehicle originally designed to explore the surface and the oceans of Enceladus, a moon of Saturn. The JPL has also referred to the possibility of using EELS to explore locations such as lunar lava tubes, Mars's polar caps, and Earth's ice sheets.

It uses multiple segments containing actuation, propulsion, power and, communication electronics. The segments use corkscrews to move across the ground. These corkscrews can act as propellers while underwater.

As of 11 May 2023, the current version (1.0) weighs approximately 100 kg (220 lb), and is 4 m (13 ft) or 10 segments long. EELS has no scientific instruments, uses stereo cameras and Lidar, and it uses a tether for power and communications.
