= List of birds of Yuma County, Arizona =

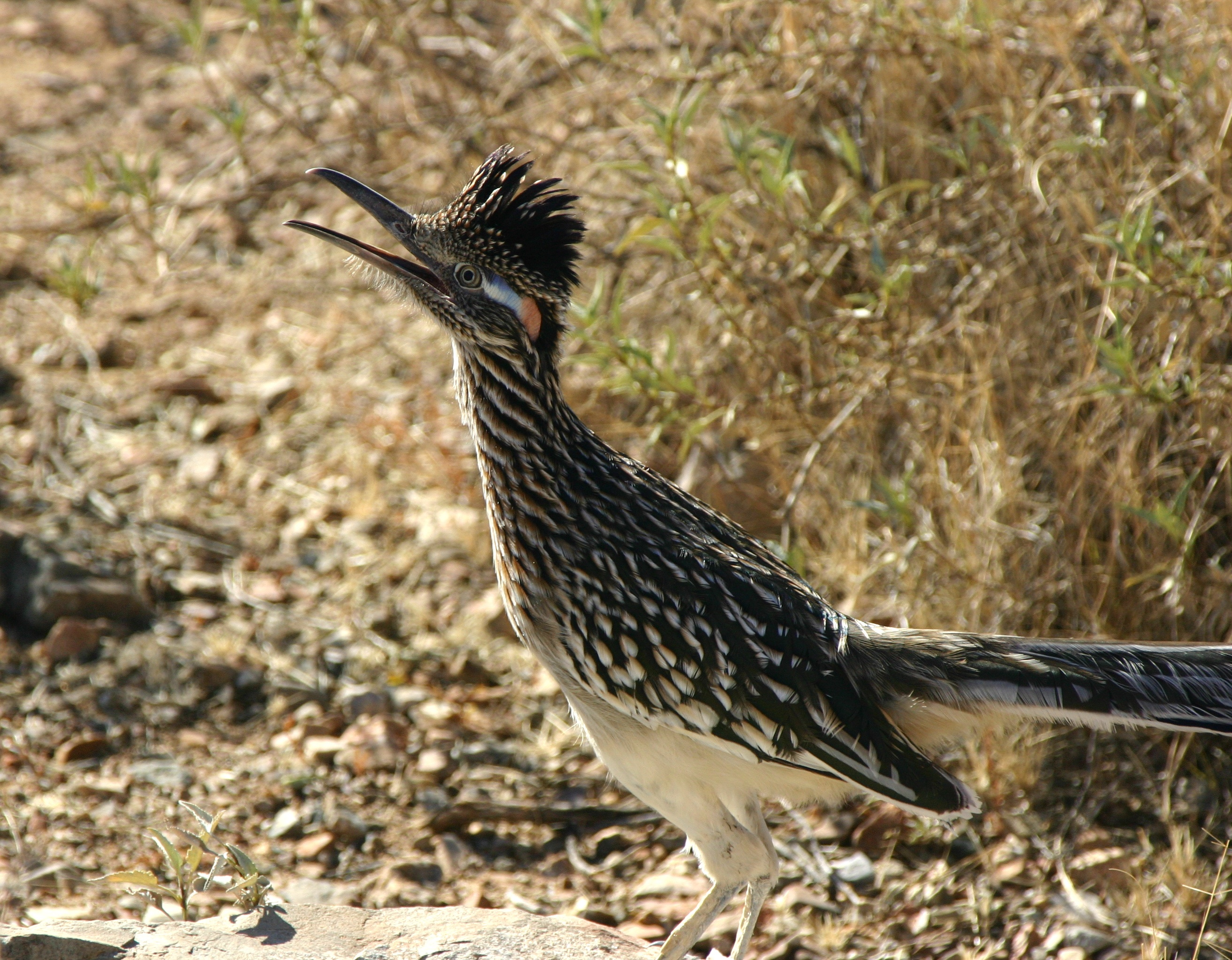
The greater roadrunner, a bird symbolic to much of Arizona, is common in all low desert environments.

This is a list of birds of Yuma County, Arizona, United States. The following markings are used:

- (A) Accidental - occurrence based on fewer than 10 records and unlikely to occur regularly
- (E) Extinct - a recent species that no longer exists
- (Ex) Extirpated - a species that no longer occurs in Yuma County, Arizona, but other populations exist elsewhere
- (I) Introduced - a population established solely as the result of direct or indirect human intervention; synonymous with “non-native” and “non-indigenous”
- (H) Hypothetical - birds that have had a credible sighting reported, but have not been documented with a specimen or suitable photograph
- (C) Casual - occasional visitor
- (SW) = found in the southwest of Arizona, Yuma County.
- sw–06 = observed in 2006.
- (* SW)—SW breeding species.
- (–L–)–16 species are found local, in a specific locality.
- LCRV– Lower Colorado River Valley

== Ducks, geese and swans ==
Order: Anseriformes Family: Anatidae

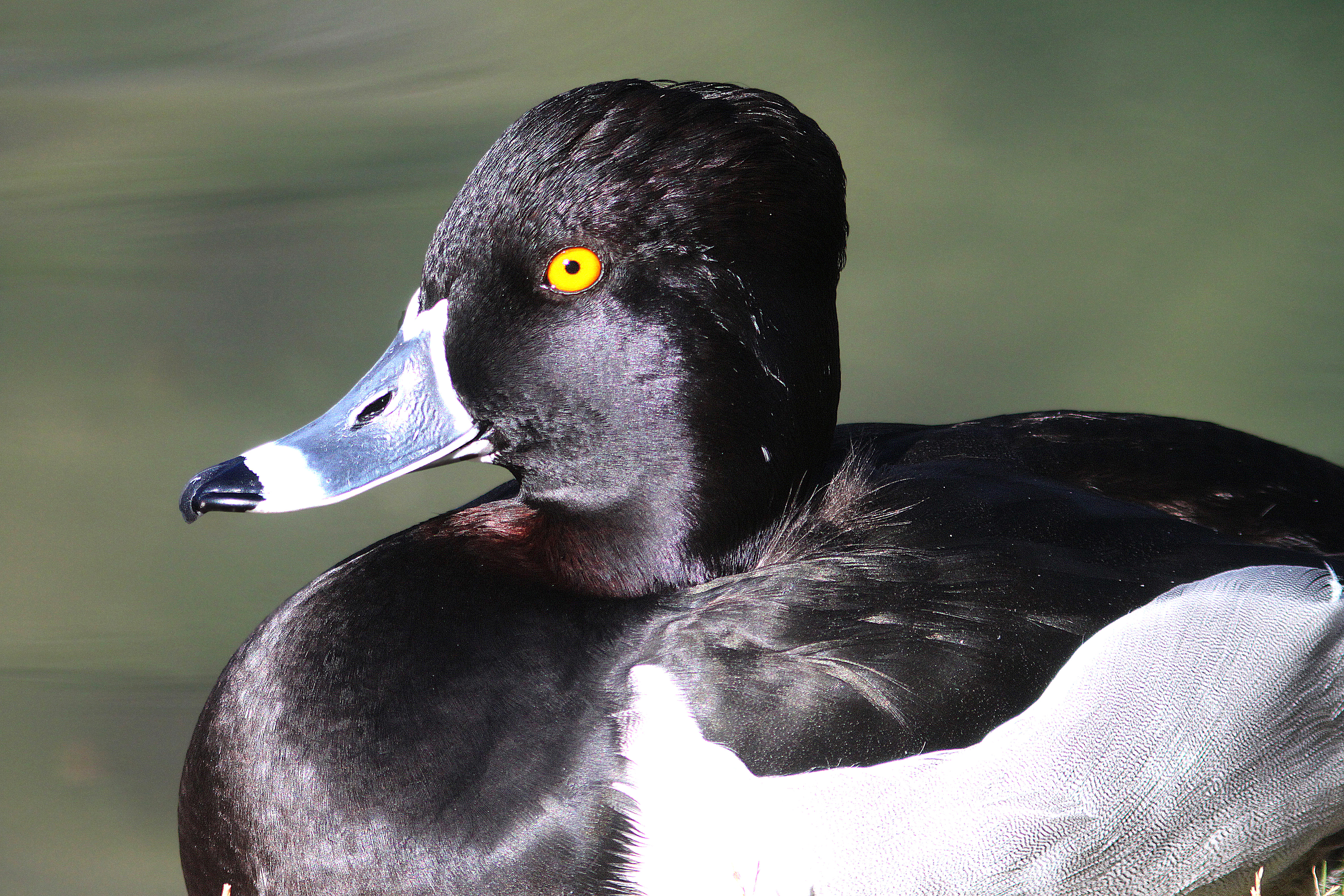
Ring-necked duck (Aythya collaris)

The family Anatidae includes the ducks and most duck-like waterfowl, such as geese and swans. These birds are adapted to an aquatic existence with webbed feet, bills which are flattened to a greater or lesser extent, and feathers that are excellent at shedding water due to special oils. There are 131 species worldwide and 61 North American species.

- Fulvous whistling duck, Dendrocygna bicolor
- Greater white-fronted goose, Anser albifrons
- Ross's goose, Chen rossii
- (–L–) Snow goose, Chen caerulescens (winters)
- Canada goose, Branta canadensis (winters)
- Brant, Branta bernicla, (brent goose),
- Tundra swan, Cygnus columbianus
- Wood duck, Aix sponsa (?Mountains, etc.)
- (* SW) Gadwall, Anas strepera (winters)
- (Eurasian wigeon, Anas penelope) Calif visitor?
- American wigeon, Anas americana (winters)
- Mallard, Anas platyrhynchos Perm ?
- Blue-winged teal, Anas discors (winters)
- (* SW) sw–06(Feb 23) Cinnamon teal, Anas cyanoptera Perm ?
- Northern shoveler, Anas clypeata (winters)
- Northern pintail, Anas acuta ?(winters) Calif & Mex.
- Green-winged teal, Anas crecca (winters)
- Canvasback, Aythya valisineria (winters)
- (* SW) Redhead, Aythya americana (winters)
- sw–06 Ring-necked duck, Aythya collaris (winters)
- Greater scaup, Aythya marila (winters)
- Lesser scaup, Aythya affinis (winters)
- Surf scoter, Melanitta perspicillata
- White-winged scoter, Melanitta fusca
- Black scoter, Melanitta nigra
- Bufflehead, Bucephala albeola (winters)
- Common goldeneye, Bucephala clangula (winters)
- Barrow's goldeneye, Bucephala islandica
- Hooded merganser, Lophodytes cucullatus (winters)
- Common merganser, Mergus merganser (winters)
- Red-breasted merganser, Mergus serrator
- (* SW) Ruddy duck, Oxyura jamaicensis Perm ?

== Partridges, grouse, turkeys and Old World quail ==
Order: Galliformes Family: Phasianidae

Phasianidae consists of the pheasants and their allies. They are terrestrial species, variable in size but generally plump with broad, relatively short wings. Many species are game birds or have been domesticated as a food source for humans. There are 16 species in North America and 180 species worldwide.

- (–L–) (* SW) Ring-necked pheasant, Phasianus colchicus, Colorado River–(Riparian) Env. (I)

== New World quail ==
Order: Galliformes Family: Odontophoridae

The New World quails are small, plump terrestrial birds; although they are only distantly related to the quails of the Old World, they were given the same name because of their similar appearance and habits. There are 6 North American species and 32 species worldwide (all found only in the Americas).

- (* SW) Gambel's quail, Callipepla gambelii, perm, non-migrating
- Montezuma quail, Cyrtonix montezumae (far-eastern and southeastern Arizona)

== Loons ==
Order: Gaviiformes Family: Gaviidae

Loons are aquatic birds the size of a large duck, to which they are unrelated. Their plumage is largely gray or black, and they have spear-shaped bills. Loons swim well and fly adequately, but are almost hopeless on land, because their legs are placed towards the rear of the body. There are 5 species worldwide and 5 North American species.

- (SW) Red-throated loon, Gavia stellata, (winter range)–Gulf of California
- (SW) Pacific loon, Gavia pacifica, (winter range)–Gulf of California
- (SW) Common loon, Gavia immer, (occasional wintering)

== Grebes ==
Order: Podicipediformes Family: Podicipedidae

Grebes are small to medium-large freshwater diving birds. They have lobed toes and are excellent swimmers and divers. However, they have their feet placed far back on the body, making them quite ungainly on land. There are 20 species worldwide and 7 North American species. Of the listed species, the horned, eared and western grebe are less commonly observed in summer.

- (* SW) Least grebe, Tachybaptus dominicus (S. Mexico)
- (* SW) Pied-billed grebe, Podilymbus podiceps Permanent and (winter range)
- (SW) Horned grebe, Podiceps auritus winters across coastal S US, S New Mex
- Red-necked grebe, Podiceps grisegena (A) Jan; Mar (from W Canada, Alaska Coast)
- (SW) Eared grebe, Podiceps nigricollis (black-necked grebe), winters permanent at: 1-S. Nev, 2-Sierra Nevada mountains (Calif) and 3-NE Colo.
- (–L–) (* SW) Western grebe, Aechmophorus occidentalis Permanent (+ winters west on Calif Coast)
- (–L–) (* SW) Clark's grebe, Aechmophorus clarkii Permanent and (winter range)

== Albatross ==
Order: Procellariiformes Family: Diomedeidae

- Laysan albatross, Phoebastria immutabilis (C)

== Storm petrels ==
Order: Procellariiformes Family: Hydrobatidae

- Leach's storm petrel, Oceanodroma leucorhoa, (A) Permanent and summer range of Pacific Ocean at Baja California, (1977)–Other pelagic species were also observed.
- Black storm petrel, Oceanodroma melania, (C) Ranges: Gulf of Calif. and Pacific Ocean of Baja California
- (SW) Least storm petrel, Oceanodroma microsoma, (A) Ranges: Gulf of Calif. and Pacific Ocean of Baja California. In 1976 Tropical Storm Kathleen transported pelagic birds throughout the Southwest; 200 sightings of the storm-petrels were made at the Salton Sea.

== Tropicbirds ==
Order: Phaethontiformes Family: Phaethontidae

- Red-billed tropicbird, Phaethon aethereus (C)

== Boobies ==
Order: Suliformes Family: Sulidae

- Blue-footed booby, Sula nebousii
- Brown booby, Sula leucogaster

== Cormorants ==
Order: Suliformes Family: Phalacrocoracidae

Cormorants are medium-to-large aquatic birds, usually with mainly dark plumage and areas of colored skin on the face. The bill is long, thin and sharply hooked. Their feet are four-toed and webbed, a distinguishing feature among the order Pelecaniformes. There are 36 species worldwide and 6 North American species.

- Brandt's cormorant, Phalacrocorax penicillatus Permanent in Gulf of California
- Neotropic cormorant, Phalacrocorax brasilianus (C)? from Coastal and Central Mexico
- (* SW) Double-crested cormorant, Phalacrocorax auritus Permanent
- (SW)Olivaceous cormorant (Mexican cormorant), Phalacrocorax olivaceous (C) (Any month) More common in Gulf of Mexico and Caribbean–(more recently observed at Salton Sea and Lake Mead)
- Pelagic cormorant, Phalacrocorax pelagicus (from Calif. coast)

== Darters ==
Order: Suliformes Family: Anhingidae

Darters are cormorant-like water birds with very long necks and long, straight beaks. They are fish eaters which often swim with only their neck above the water. There are 4 species worldwide and 1 North American species.

- Anhinga, Anhinga anhinga, (old sight records, 1900, 1913-etc.)

== Frigatebirds ==
Order: Suliformes Family: Fregatidae

Frigatebirds are large seabirds usually found over tropical oceans. They are large, black, or black-and-white, with long wings and deeply forked tails. The males have colored inflatable throat pouches. They do not swim or walk and cannot take off from a flat surface. Having the largest wingspan-to-body-weight ratio of any bird, they are essentially aerial, able to stay aloft for more than a week. There are 5 species worldwide and 3 North American species.

- (SW) Magnificent frigatebird, Fregata magnificens (C) Occasional, often seen yearly, possibly on flyway to Salton Sea–sightings may also be of great frigatebird(in-flight)

== Pelicans ==
Order: Pelecaniformes Family: Pelecanidae

Pelicans are very large water birds with a distinctive pouch under their beak. Like other birds in the order Pelecaniformes, they have four webbed toes. There are 8 species worldwide and 2 North American species.

- (SW) American white pelican, Pelecanus erythrorhynchos, (summer range); observed in flocks.
- (SW) Brown pelican, Pelecanus occidentalis (Common seasonal vagrant in SW Arizona), Permanent in Gulf of California and Pacific Ocean of Baja; (Common post-breeding.)

== Pelecaniformes: bitterns, herons and egrets ==
Order: Pelecaniformes Family: Ardeidae

The family Ardeidae contains the herons, egrets and bitterns. Herons and egrets are medium to large wading birds with long necks and legs. Bitterns tend to be shorter necked and more secretive. Members of Ardeidae fly with their necks retracted, unlike other long-necked birds such as storks, ibises and spoonbills. There are 61 species worldwide and 17 North American species.

- (* SW) American bittern, Botaurus lentiginosus (winters?)
- (* SW) Least bittern, Ixobrychus exilis
- (* SW) Great blue heron, Ardea herodias
- (* SW) Great egret, Ardea alba
- (* SW) Snowy egret, Egretta thula (?)
- (SW) Cattle egret, Bubulcus ibis
- (* SW) Green heron, Butorides virescens, (green-backed heron)
- (* SW) Black-crowned night heron, Nycticorax nycticorax

== Pelecaniformes: ibises and spoonbills ==
Order: Ciconiiformes Family: Threskiornithidae

The family Threskiornithidae includes the ibises and spoonbills. They have long, broad wings. Their bodies tend to be elongated, the neck more so, with rather long legs. The bill is also long, decurved in the case of the ibises, and straight and distinctively flattened in the spoonbills. There are 36 species worldwide and 5 North American species.

- American white ibis, Eudocimus albus (?) (winters in northern Gulf of California)
- White-faced ibis, Plegadis chihi (?) (winters in northern Gulf of California)
- Roseate spoonbill, Ajaia ajaja

== Ciconiiformes: storks ==
Order: Ciconiiformes Family: Ciconiidae

Storks are large, heavy, long-legged, long-necked wading birds with long stout bills and wide wingspans. They lack the powder down that other wading birds such as herons, spoonbills and ibises use to clean off fish slime. Storks lack a pharynx and are mute. There are 19 species worldwide and 2 North American species.

- Wood stork, Mycteria americana (only population in S. FL)

== Cathartiformes: New World vultures ==
Order: Cathartiformes Family: Cathartidae The New World vultures are not closely related to Old World vultures, but resemble them because of convergent evolution and the forces of function, ("form follows function"). Like the Old World vultures, they are scavengers, and their major trait besides the bare/feather-less neck, would be their trait of, "searching by soaring". However, unlike Old World vultures, which find carcasses by sight, New World vultures have a good sense of smell with which they also locate carcasses. There are 7 species worldwide, all found only in the Americas, and 3 North American species.

- Black vulture, Coragyps atratus (far E. Arizona?/–S. Central Arizona, south on western continental coast of Mex., E. Gulf of California)
- (* SW) Turkey vulture, Cathartes aura, Note: gathers and migrates in updrafts, up to hundreds of individuals, up to 4000 ft(?) heights
- California condor, Gymnogyps californianus: emplaced in far northern Arizona (NW Arizona/Grand Canyon–Lake Mead region).

== Osprey ==
Order: Accipitriformes Family: Pandionidae

- (SW) Osprey, Pandion haliaetus. all Riverine environments: Colorado River, Gila, Lakes, etc.

== Hawks, kites and eagles ==
Order: Accipitriformes Family: Accipitridae

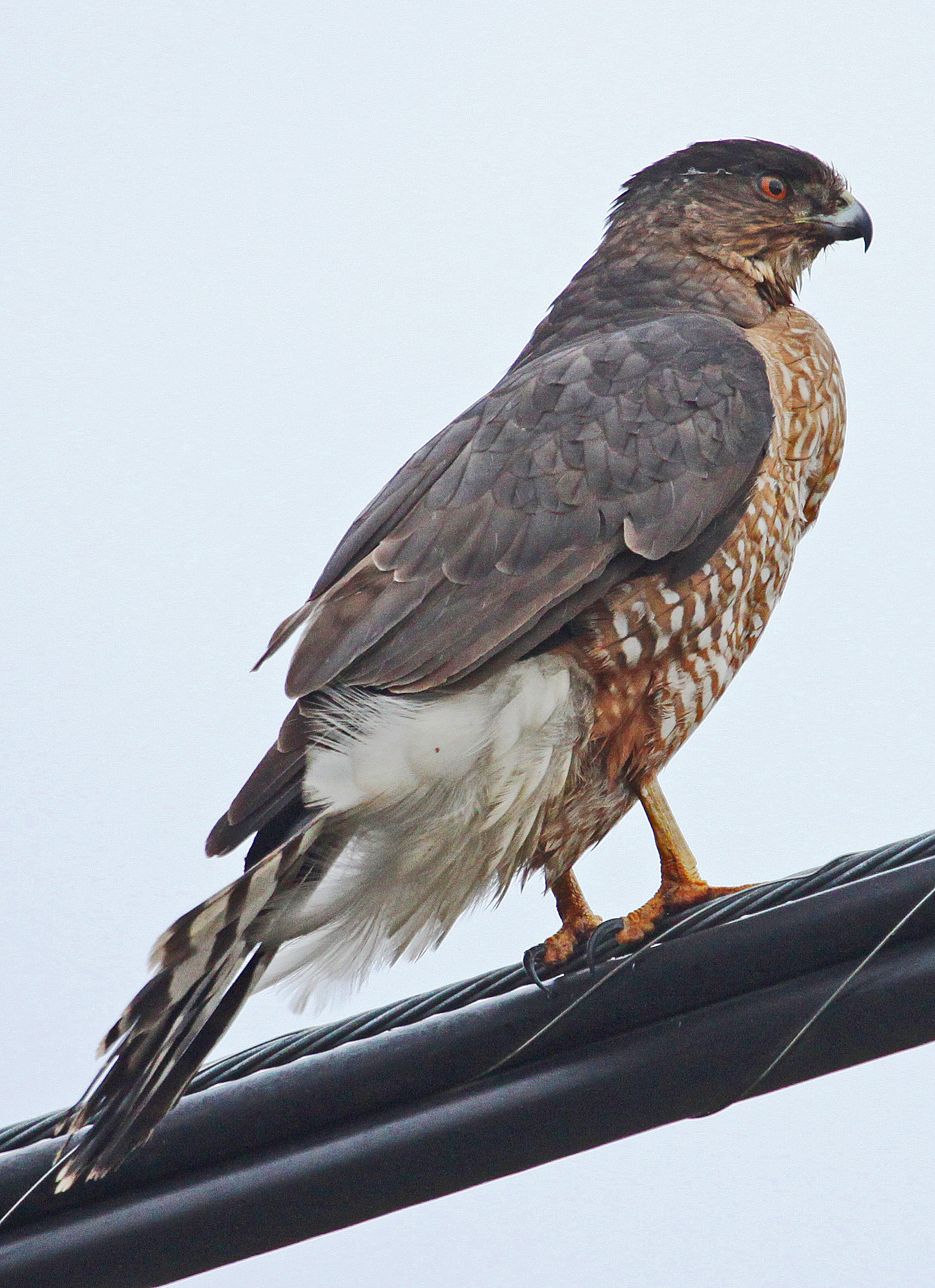
Cooper's hawk (Accipiter cooperii)

Accipitridae is a family of birds of prey, which includes hawks, eagles, kites, harriers and Old World vultures. These birds have very large powerful hooked beaks for tearing the flesh from their prey, strong legs, powerful talons and keen eyesight.

- Bald eagle, Haliaeetus leucocephalus (winter range)
- (SW) Northern harrier, Circus cyaneus (winter range)
- (SW) Sharp-shinned hawk, Accipiter striatus (winter range)
- (* SW) Cooper's hawk, Accipiter cooperii ?? permanent and winters
- (* SW) Harris's hawk, Parabuteo unicinctus (S. Arizona & Mex)??
- (* SW) Red-shouldered hawk, Buteo lineatus from Calif. ?
- (SW) Swainson's hawk, Buteo swainsoni (Mountains: eastern and northern Arizona) ?
- (–L–) Zone-tailed hawk, Buteo albonotatus
- (* SW) Red-tailed hawk, Buteo jamaicensis
- (SW) Ferruginous hawk, Buteo regalis (winter range)
- Golden eagle, Aquila chrysaetos (winter range) and Perm ?

== Caracaras and falcons ==
Order: Falconiformes Family: Falconidae

Falconidae is a family of diurnal birds of prey, notably the falcons and caracaras. They differ from hawks, eagles and kites in that they kill with their beaks instead of their talons. There are 62 species worldwide and 10 North American species.

- Crested caracara, Polyborus plancus (C) in Dec, Jan
- (* SW) American kestrel, Falco sparverius Permanent
  - (SW) formerly Eurasian sparrowhawk, Accipiter nisus
- Merlin, Falco columbarius (winter range)
- (* SW) Peregrine falcon, Falco peregrinus Permanent
- (* SW) Prairie falcon, Falco mexicanus Permanent and (winter range) Less common in summer: Apr-Aug

== Crakes, gallinules and coots ==
Order: Gruiformes Family: Rallidae

Rallidae is a large family of small to medium-sized birds which includes the rails, crakes, coots and gallinules. The most typical family members occupy dense vegetation in damp environments near lakes, swamps or rivers. In general they are shy and secretive birds, making them difficult to observe. Most species have strong legs and long toes which are well adapted to soft uneven surfaces. They tend to have short, rounded wings and tend to be weak fliers. There are 143 species worldwide and 13 North American species. Of the 6 listed birds, the black rail is rare and local; only the clapper rail is more common in summer. All are breeding species except the Sora, which departs from May-Jul(Aug) and which has an extensive summer range across North America.

- (–L–) (* SW) Black rail, Laterallus jamaicensis found in restricted oceanic coastal areas, Permanent in Lower Colorado River Valley–LCRV
- (* SW) Ridgway's rail, Rallus obsoletus same note, more common in summer: (Mar)Apr-Aug(Sep)
- (* SW) Virginia rail, Rallus limicola Permanent
- (SW) Sora, Porzana carolina (winter range), least common in summer: May-(Aug)
- (* SW) Common moorhen, Gallinula chloropus Permanent (East: Atlantic coast bird)
- (* SW) American coot, Fulica americana Permanent

== Cranes ==
Order: Gruiformes Family: Gruidae

Cranes are large, long-legged and long-necked birds. Unlike the similar-looking, but unrelated herons– cranes fly with necks outstretched, not pulled back. Most have elaborate and noisy courting displays or "dances". There are 15 species worldwide and 3 North American species.

- (–L–) (SW) Sandhill crane, Grus canadensis (winter range)–southern Arizona

== Lapwings and plovers ==
Order: Charadriiformes Family: Charadriidae

The family Charadriidae includes the plovers, dotterels and lapwings. They are small to medium-sized birds with compact bodies, short, thick necks and long, usually pointed, wings. They are found in open country worldwide, mostly in habitats near water. There are 66 species worldwide and 17 North American species. Of the 6 listed species, most are winter ranging. The killdeer is permanent, but less common in late May through early August.

- (SW) Black-bellied plover (gray plover), Pluvialis squatarola (winter range), Gulf of California and Pacific coast
- Lesser golden-plover (American golden plover), Pluvialis dominica (C) (Arctic ranging: summer)
- (SW) Snowy plover, Charadrius alexandrinus (Charadrius nivosus) (winter range), Gulf of California coast, permanent on Pacific coast–also fairly common at Salton Sea
- (SW) Semipalmated plover, Charadrius semipalmatus (winter range), Baja California and western Mexico coast
- (* SW) Killdeer, Charadrius vociferus Permanent–less common in summer: June and July
- (SW) Mountain plover, Charadrius montanus (winter range), southern Arizona border and southeast Arizona biome

== Stilts and avocets ==
Order: Charadriiformes Family: Recurvirostridae

Recurvirostridae is a family of large wading birds, which includes the avocets and stilts. The avocets have long legs and long up-curved bills. The stilts have extremely long legs and long, thin, straight bills. There are 9 species worldwide and 3 North American species.

== Sandpipers, curlews, stints, godwits, snipes and phalaropes ==
Order: Charadriiformes Family: Scolopacidae

Scolopacidae is a large diverse family of small to medium-sized shorebirds including the sandpipers, curlews, godwits, shanks, tattlers, woodcocks, snipes, dowitchers and phalaropes. The majority of these species eat small invertebrates picked out of the mud or soil. Different lengths of legs and bills enable multiple species to feed in the same habitat, particularly on the coast, without direct competition for food. There are 86 species worldwide and 65 North American species.

- (SW) Long-billed curlew, Numenius americanus (winter migrator, upon grassy expanses, etc.)

== Skuas, gulls, terns and skimmers ==
Order: Charadriiformes Family: Laridae

Laridae is a family of medium to large seabirds and includes jaegers, skuas, gulls, terns, kittiwakes and skimmers. They are typically gray or white, often with black markings on the head or wings. They have stout, longish bills and webbed feet. There are 108 species worldwide and 54 North American species.

- (?)California gull, Larus californicus

== Pigeons and doves ==
Order: Columbiformes Family: Columbidae

Pigeons and doves are stout-bodied birds with short necks and short slender bills with a fleshy cere. There are 308 species worldwide and 18 North American species.

- (* SW) Rock pigeon, Columba livia (I)
- Band-tailed pigeon, Columba fasciata
- Spotted dove, Streptopelia chinensis
- (* SW) White-winged dove, Zenaida asiatica
- (* SW) Mourning dove, Zenaida macroura
- Passenger pigeon, Ectopistes migratorius (E)
- (–L–) (* SW) Inca dove, Columbina inca
- (* SW) Common ground-dove, Columbina passerina
- Ruddy ground dove, Columbina talpacoti

== Lories, parakeets, macaws and parrots ==
Order: Psittaciformes Family: Psittacidae

Parrots are small to large birds with a characteristic curved beak. Their upper mandibles have slight mobility in the joint with the skull and they have a generally erect stance. All parrots are zygodactyl, having the four toes on each foot placed two at the front and two to the back. There are 335 species worldwide and 8 North American species.

- Thick-billed parrot Extirpated from SE Arizona biome, only in Mexico, (Ex)
- Pet trade: released or escaped individuals, etc. are commonly observed.

== Cuckoos, roadrunners and anis ==
Order: Cuculiformes Family: Cuculidae

The family Cuculidae includes cuckoos, roadrunners and anis. These birds are of variable size with slender bodies, long tails and strong legs. There are 138 species worldwide and 8 North American species.

- (* SW) Yellow-billed cuckoo, Coccyus americanus
- (SW) Greater roadrunner, Geococcyx californianus

== Barn owls ==
Order: Strigiformes Family: Tytonidae

Barn owls are medium to large owls with large heads and characteristic heart-shaped faces. They have long strong legs with powerful talons. There are 16 species worldwide and 1 North American species.

- (* SW) Barn owl, Tyto alba

== Typical owls ==
Order: Strigiformes Family: Strigidae

Typical owls are small to large solitary nocturnal birds of prey. They have large forward-facing eyes and ears, a nearly 360-plus degree swivel-neck, a hawk-like beak and a conspicuous circle of feathers around each eye called a facial disk (?for low night-light focus-reflection). There are 195 species worldwide and 21 North American species.

- Flammulated owl, Otus flammeolus (C) (non-desert owl: mountains of Arizona, SE Arizona biome)
- (* SW) Western screech owl, Megascops kennicottii
- (* SW) Great horned owl, Bubo virginianus
- (–L–) (* SW) Elf owl, Micrathene whitneyi
- (* SW) Burrowing owl, Athene cunicularia, Conspicuous in Urban setting, also observed in daytime, early morning or evening.
- (SW) Ferruginous pygmy owl, Glaucidium brasilianum SE Arizona biome, mountains of Mex: S. Madre Occid.
- (* SW) Long-eared owl, Asio otus
- (SW) Short-eared owl, Asio flammeus, (winter range)
- Northern saw-whet owl, Aegolius acadicus (C) Permanent in Four Corners, SE Arizona biome, winters in E Arizona

== Goatsuckers and nighthawks ==
Order: Caprimulgiformes Family: Caprimulgidae

Nightjars are medium-sized nocturnal birds that usually nest on the ground. They have long wings, short legs and very short bills. Most have small feet, of little use for walking, and long pointed wings. Their soft plumage is cryptically colored to resemble bark or leaves. There are 86 species worldwide and 9 North American species. (It is noted under the nightjar article, that specific species can perch non-perpendicular or transverse, on a branch, as a higher point of camouflage.)

- (* SW) Lesser nighthawk, Chordeiles acutipennis
- Common nighthawk, Chordeiles minor, (C)
- (* SW) Common poorwill, Phalaenoptilus nuttallii
- Buff-collared nightjar, Caprimulgus ridgwayi
- Whip-poor-will, Caprimulgus vociferus

== Swifts ==
Order: Apodiformes Family: Apodidae

The swifts are small birds which spend the majority of their lives flying. These birds have very short legs and never settle voluntarily on the ground, perching instead only on vertical surfaces. Many swifts have very long swept–back wings that resemble a crescent or boomerang. There are 98 species worldwide and 9 North American species.

- White-throated swift, Aeronautes saxatalis, (winter range) and (~)Permanent

== Hummingbirds ==
Order: Trochiliformes Family: Trochilidae

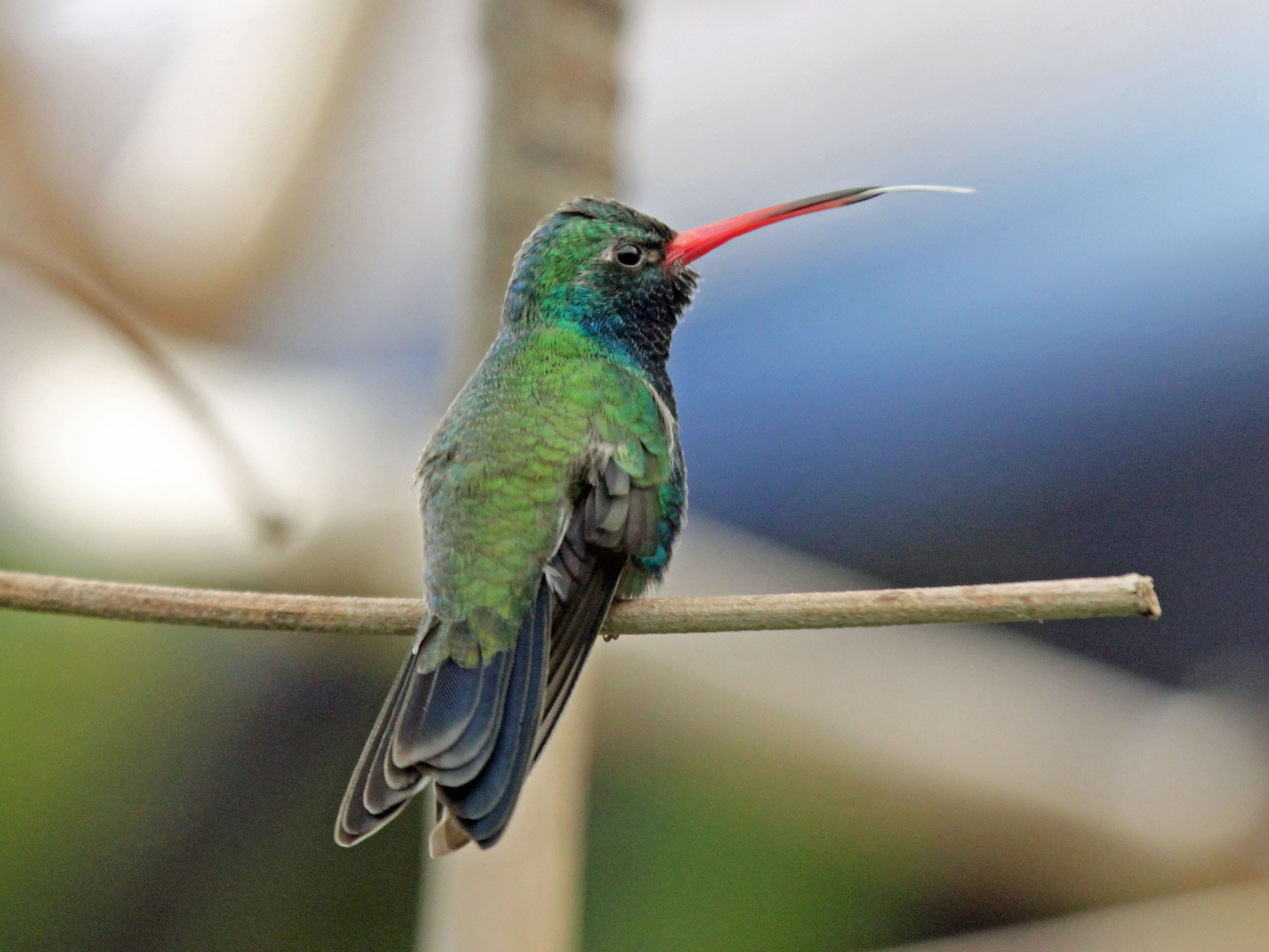
Broad-billed hummingbird (Cynanthis latirostris)

Hummingbirds are small birds capable of hovering in mid-air due to the rapid flapping of their wings. They are the only birds that can fly backwards. There are 337 species worldwide and 23 North American species. Hummingbirds in Arizona, range from the mountains to the desert, as well as have wintering– and summering–ranges–(from S Mexico to the North American Northwest).

- (SW) Broad-billed hummingbird, Cynanthis latirostris (Occasional, extended stays)-from SE Arizona biome/ Mexico (west)
- (* SW) sw–06(?) Black-chinned hummingbird, Archilochus alexandri
- (* SW) Anna's hummingbird, Calypte anna
- (* SW) Costa's hummingbird, Calypte costae
- Rufous hummingbird, Selasphorus rufus
- The following are (C) or (A)
  - Broad-billed hummingbird, Cynanthis latirostris
  - Calliope hummingbird, Stellula calliope (C) summers in California mountains, winters in southern Mexico-(Apr, +Sep)
  - Broad-tailed hummingbird, Selasphorus platycercus (C)–breeds in mountains of Arizona
  - Allen's hummingbird, Selasphorus sasin (C) (Feb and Jul-Sep)–from Pacific California coast
- Seen or breeding in Arizona and sightings possible:
  - White-eared hummingbird, Hylocharis leucotis
  - sw–06(?) Xantus's hummingbird, Hylocharis xantusii (can summer S Calif deserts)
  - Violet-crowned hummingbird, Amazilia violiceps
  - Blue-throated hummingbird, Lampornis clemenciae
  - Magnificent hummingbird, Eugenes fulgens
  - Plain-capped starthroat, Heliomaster constantii
  - Lucifer hummingbird, Calothorax lucifer

== Trogons (quetzals) ==
Order: Trogoniformes Family: Trogonidae

- Elegant trogon, Trogon elegans SE Arizona biome: Permanent, (and summer range)
- Eared quetzal. Euptilotis neoxenus, Permanent: SE Arizona biome

== Kingfishers ==
Order: Coraciiformes Family: Alcedinidae

Kingfishers are medium-sized birds with large heads, long, pointed bills, short legs and stubby tails. There are 94 species worldwide and 3 North American species.

- (SW) Belted kingfisher, Ceryle alcyon—(Fairly common except in May-Jul)
- Green kingfisher, Chloroceryle americana (C) —Casual along the S Arizona/Mexico border–(1988 sightings in the LCRV at same time as first-time breeding in SE Arizona biome)

== Woodpeckers, sapsuckers and flickers ==
Order: Piciformes Family: Picidae

Woodpeckers are small to medium-sized birds with chisel-like beaks, short legs, stiff tails and long tongues used for capturing insects. Some species have feet with two toes pointing forward and two backward, while several species have only three toes. Many woodpeckers have the habit of tapping noisily on tree trunks with their beaks, (or state a pronounced, declared territorial call, while searching in their feeding range: it is obvious that they have arrived or are passing by in their territory. There are 218 species worldwide and 26 North American species. The 3 permanent breeding species are the Gila and ladder-backed woodpeckers and the gilded flicker.

- Lewis's woodpecker, Melanerpes lewis, (winter range)
- Acorn woodpecker, Melanerpes formicivorus (C) (Jun and Oct, Nov – also observed in Calif deserts/ Salton Sea)
- (* SW) Gila woodpecker, Melanerpes uropygialis, Permanent
- Williamson's sapsucker, Sphyrapicus thyroideus, (C) from higher elevations(winter)-Dec and Mar
- Yellow-bellied sapsucker, Sphyrapicus varius, (winter range)
- Red-naped sapsucker, Sphyrapicus nuchalis, (winter range)
- Red-breasted sapsucker, Sphyrapicus ruber, (winter range)
- (* SW) Ladder-backed woodpecker, Picoides scalaris, Permanent
- Yellow-shafted flicker, northern flicker, (winter range)
- Red-shafted flicker, northern flicker, (winter range)
- (–L–) (* SW) Gilded flicker (northern flicker), Colaptes chrysoides, Permanent

== Tyrant flycatchers ==
Order: Passeriformes Family: Tyrannidae

Tyrant flycatchers are Passerine birds which occur throughout North and South America. They superficially resemble the Old World flycatchers, but are more robust and have stronger bills. They do not have the sophisticated vocal capabilities of the songbirds. Most, but not all, are rather plain. As the name implies, most are insectivorous. There are 429 species worldwide, all found only in the Americas and 45 North American species.

- (* SW) Willow flycatcher, Empidonax traillii
- Gray flycatcher, Empidonax wrightii
- Dusky flycatcher, Empidonax oberholseri
- Cordilleran flycatcher, Empidonax occidentalis
- (* SW) Black phoebe, Sayornis nigricans
- (* SW) Say's phoebe, Sayornis saya
- (–L–) (* SW) Vermilion flycatcher, Pyrocephalus rubinus
- Dusky-capped flycatcher
- (* SW) Ash-throated flycatcher, Myiarchus cinerascens
- Nutting's flycatcher
- (* SW) Brown-crested flycatcher, Myiarchus tyrannulus
- (* SW) Cassin's kingbird, Tyrannus vociferans
- (* SW) Western kingbird, Tyrannus verticalis

== Shrikes ==
Order: Passeriformes Family: Laniidae

Shrikes are passerine birds known for their habit of catching other birds and small animals and impaling the uneaten portions of their bodies on thorns, (creating a larder to attract a female). A typical shrike's beak is hooked, like a bird of prey. There are 31 species worldwide and 3 North American species. The loggerhead shrike is extremely abundant in the low desert/ chaparral environment.

- (* SW) Loggerhead shrike, Lanius ludovicianus, Permanent
- Northern shrike, great gray shrike Lanius excubitor, (C) (winter range: to S Nev, S Utah, S Colo–Nov, Dec, Jan [adults and immatures])

== Vireos ==
Order: Passeriformes Family: Vireonidae

The vireos are a group of small to medium-sized passerine birds restricted to the New World. They are typically greenish in color and resemble wood warblers apart from their heavier bills. There are 52 species worldwide and 16 North American species.

- (–L–) (* SW) Bell's vireo, Vireo bellii
- Gray vireo, Vireo vicinior

== Jays, crows, magpies and ravens ==
Order: Passeriformes Family: Corvidae

The family Corvidae includes crows, ravens, jays, choughs, magpies, treepies, nutcrackers and ground jays. Corvids are above average in size among the Passeriformes, and some of the larger species show high levels of intelligence. There are 120 species worldwide and 21 North American species.

- (?)Woodhouse's scrub jay, Aphelocoma woodhouseii
- (?)Mexican jay, Aphelocoma ultramarina (A)
- (–L–) American crow, Corvus brachyrhynchos (more northerly range)
- (* SW) Common raven, Corvus corax

== Larks ==
Order: Passeriformes Family: Alaudidae
Larks are small terrestrial birds with often extravagant songs and display flights, zigzagging flocks ! ? 14-40 individuals). Most larks are fairly dull in appearance. Their food is insects and seeds. There are 91 species worldwide and 2 North American species.

- (* SW) Horned lark, Eremophila alpestris (winter, migrating SE-ward)
- Skylark, Alauda arvensis

== Swallows and martins ==
Order: Passeriformes Family: Hirundinidae

The family Hirundinidae is adapted to aerial feeding. They have a slender streamlined body, long pointed wings and a short bill with a wide gape. The feet are adapted to perching rather than walking, and the front toes are partially joined at the base. There are 75 species worldwide and 14 North American species.

- Tree swallow, Tachycineta bicolor
- (* SW) Violet-green swallow, Tachycineta thalassina
- (* SW) Northern rough-winged swallow, Stelgidopteryx serripennis
- Bank swallow, Riparia riparia
- (* SW) Cliff swallow, Petrochelidon pyrrhonota
- Barn swallow, Hirundo rustica

== Chickadees and titmice ==
Order: Passeriformes Family: Paridae

The Paridae are mainly small stocky woodland species with short stout bills. Some have crests. They are adaptable birds, with a mixed diet including seeds and insects. There are 59 species worldwide and 12 North American species.

- Mountain chickadee, Poecile gambeli, Permanent: mountains in N, E and Central Arizona
- Mexican chickadee, -Poecile sclateri, Permanent: SE Arizona biome
- Bridled titmouse, Baeolophus wollweberi, Permanent: SE Arizona biome–and Central Arizona mountains
- Oak titmouse, ----Baeolophus inornatus, N Baja Calif., the Peninsular Ranges mountains
- Juniper titmouse, Baeolophus ridgwayi, Permanent: N, E and SE mountains
- (* SW) Verdin, Auriparus flaviceps, Only in Low Desert: Perm,-Non–migrating

== Bushtits ==
Order: Passeriformes Family: Aegithalidae

Long-tailed tits are a group of small passerine birds with medium to long tails. They make woven bag nests in trees. Most eat a mixed diet which includes insects. There are 9 species worldwide and 1 North American species.

- Bushtit, Psaltriparus minimus

== Nuthatches ==
Order: Passeriformes Family: Sittidae

Nuthatches are small woodland birds. They have the unusual ability to climb down trees head first, unlike other birds which can only go upwards. Nuthatches have big heads, short tails and powerful bills and feet. There are 24 species worldwide and 4 North American species.

- Red-breasted nuthatch, --Sitta canadensis
- White-breasted nuthatch, Sitta carolinensis
- Pygmy nuthatch, Sitta pygmaea

== Treecreepers ==
Order: Passeriformes Family: Certhiidae

Treecreepers are small woodland birds, brown above and white below. They have thin pointed down-curved bills, which they use to extricate insects from bark. They have stiff tail feathers, like woodpeckers, which they use to support themselves on vertical trees. There are 6 species worldwide and 1 North American species.

- (–L–) (SW) Brown creeper, Certhia americana, Permanent in 1–NE, E Arizona mountains, 2–SE Arizona biome, winter: not seen (Apr)May-Sep

== Wrens ==
Order: Passeriformes Family: Troglodytidae

Wrens are small and inconspicuous birds, except for their (almost) loud songs, (? the size of the bird limits their loudness). They have short wings and thin down-turned bills. Several species often hold their tails upright. All are insectivorous. (The cactus wren is a larger bird of the group.) There are 79 species worldwide and 9 North American species.

- (* SW) Cactus wren, Campylorhynchus brunneicapillus
- (* SW) Rock wren, Salpinctes obsoletus (An avid ground searcher, amidst ground tumble(rocks, etc.).)
- (–L–) (* SW) Canyon wren, Catherpes mexicanus
- (* SW) Bewick's wren, Thryomanes bewickii
- (* SW) Marsh wren, Cistothorus palustris

== Dippers ==
Order: Passeriformes Family: Cinclidae

The American dipper ranges from Alaska to Mexico in mountain streams. It is permanent at the Colorado River, in the Grand Canyon and has been observed in the N Lower Colorado River Valley.

- American dipper, Cinclus mexicanus, (called water ouzel)

== Kinglets ==
Order: Passeriformes Family: Regulidae

The kinglets are a small family of birds which resemble the titmice. They are very small insectivorous birds in the genus Regulus. The adults have colored crowns, giving rise to their name. There are 5 species worldwide and 2 North American species. Both North American species reside permanently in the mountains of E Arizona.

- Golden-crowned kinglet, Regulus satrapa, Permanent and (summer range)–mountains of E Arizona, rare, but consistent visits: Oct-Dec(Feb)(Mar)
- (SW) Ruby-crowned kinglet, Regulus calendula, Permanent and (summer range)–mountains of E Arizona, (Sep) Oct - Apr (May)

== Gnatcatchers ==
Order: Passeriformes Family: Polioptilidae

The family Polioptilidae is a group of small insectivorous passerine birds.

- Blue-gray gnatcatcher, Polioptila caerulea
- (* SW) Black-tailed gnatcatcher, Polioptila melanura

== Thrushes ==
Order: Passeriformes Family: Turdidae

The thrushes are a group of passerine birds that occur mainly but not exclusively in the Old World. They are plump, soft plumaged, small to medium-sized insectivores or sometimes omnivores, often feeding on the ground. Many have attractive songs. There are 335 species worldwide and 28 North American species.

- (SW) Mountain bluebird, Sialia currucoides (winter)
- (* SW) American robin, Turdus migratorius (migrating)

== Mockingbirds and thrashers ==
Order: Passeriformes Family: Mimidae

The mimids are a family of passerine birds which includes thrashers, mockingbirds, tremblers and the New World catbirds. These birds are notable for their vocalization, especially their remarkable ability to mimic a wide variety of birds and other sounds heard outdoors. The species tend towards dull grays, blacks and browns in their appearance. There are 35 species worldwide and 13 North American species and ?4 permanent SW-Arizona resident species.

The northern mockingbird has been extending its range, low desert, mountain foothills, north and east of Yuma, as the cities to the east of Yuma have been developing, (?) since 1995. They sing in the same distinctive manner and have the same arboreal displays, but their plumage is more pronounced, with darker blacks and darker grays (? to contrast with brite white). The arboreal display is energetic (? and territorial) and consists of vertical climbs and falls, above a (choice, selected)tree perch. (In some of 2004, 2005, the huge influx N into the foothills and desert grasslands, are much grayer birds, much like the city birds.)

- Gray catbird, Dumetella carolinensis, --(Only local in the northern White Mountains and northeastward.)
- (* SW) Northern mockingbird, Mimus polyglottos, --Permanent (now in desert locales)
- (SW) Sage thrasher, Oreoscoptes montanus, winter range/resident
- Bendire's thrasher, Toxostoma bendirei, --[Permanent: SE Arizona biome] (summer ranging north of Yuma County, etc. in Az.)
- Curve-billed thrasher, Toxostoma curvirostre, --Permanent E. and NE of Yuma County
- California thrasher, Toxostoma redivivum—a vagrant from Southern Calif.(?)
- (* SW) Crissal thrasher, Toxostoma crissale, ---(Permanent from Colo R./Calif. border, the deserts and S into Mex (W. and Central), from S. New Mexico southward. Permanent like the quail, no seasonal–Ranging.)
- (SW) Le Conte's thrasher, Toxostoma lecontei, ---Permanent and local, in hot, lower, deserts: (very S. Colorado Des.(S. Calif.), Pacific locales in Baja Calif Sur and SW Arizona (and very N. Mexico); no seasonal–Ranging.)(3rd locale: the Carrizo Plain and valley, N of Los Angeles, in the Coastal Ranges)

== Starlings ==
Order: Passeriformes Family: Sturnidae

Starlings are small to medium-sized passerines with strong feet. Their flight is strong and direct and they are very gregarious. Their preferred habitat is fairly open country, (occasionally seen in open desert, semi-grassland) and they eat insects and fruit. Plumage is typically dark with a metallic sheen. There are 125 species worldwide and 3 North American species.

- (* SW) European starling, Sturnus vulgaris (I) (also: solitary or paired low desert (grassland) travelers)

== Wagtails and pipits ==
Order: Passeriformes Family: Motacillidae

Motacillidae is a family of small passerine birds with medium to long tails. They include the wagtails, longclaws and pipits. They are slender, ground feeding insectivores of open country. There are 54 species worldwide and 11 North American species.

- (SW) American pipit, Anthus rubescens, (the buff-bellied pipit), winter range/resident– breeds in Arizona; leaves the lower Colorado River Valley from mid-May–(Sep)Oct
- Sprague's pipit, Anthus spragueii, SE Arizona biome winter range

== Waxwings ==
Order: Passeriformes Family: Bombycillidae

The waxwings are a group of passerine birds with soft silky plumage and unique red tips to some of the wing feathers. In the Bohemian and cedar waxwings, these tips look like sealing wax and give the group its name. These are arboreal birds of northern forest. They live on insects in summer and berries in winter. There are 3 species worldwide and 2 North American species.

- Bohemian waxwing, Bombycilla garrulus (C) or (A) winter ranges into N Nev, N Utah, N Colo; observed in Lower Colorado River Valley–Jan, Feb, Mar
- (SW) Cedar waxwing, Bombycilla cedrorum (winter range/resident)

== Silky-flycatchers ==
Order: Passeriformes Family: Ptiliogonatidae

The silky-flycatchers are a small family of passerine birds which occur mainly in Central America, although the range of one species extends to Central California(San Joaquin Valley) and much of the SW deserts and mountains. They are related to waxwings and like that group, have soft silky plumage, usually gray or pale-yellow. They have small crests. There are 4 New World (Americas) species and 3 North American species.

- (* SW) Phainopepla, Phainopepla nitens (found in secluded mountain canyons, etc., (also Colorado River)–riparian environment-(near mistletoe berries--)

== Wood-warblers ==
Order: Passeriformes Family: Parulidae

The wood warblers are a group of small often colorful passerine birds restricted to the New World. Most are arboreal, but some are more terrestrial. Most members of this family are insectivores. There are 119 species worldwide and 57 North American species. Half of the listed warblers are accidental or casual visitors.

- Orange-crowned warbler, Vermivora celata, year-round, except June and July
- Nashville warbler, Vermivora ruficapilla
- Virginia's warbler, Vermivora virginiae
- (* SW) Lucy's warbler, Vermivora luciae
- (* SW) Northern parula, Parula americana
- (* SW) Yellow warbler, Dendroica petechia
- Yellow-rumped warbler, Dendroica coronata
  - Audubon's warbler, Dendroica coronata auduboni
  - Myrtle warbler, Dendroica coronata coronata
- Black-throated gray warbler, Dendroica nigrescens
- Townsend's warbler, Dendroica townsendi
- Hermit warbler, Dendroica occidentalis
- Black-and-white warbler, Mniotilta varia
- American redstart, Setophaga ruticilla
- Northern waterthrush, Seiurus noveboracensis
- (SW) MacGillivray's warbler
- (* SW) Common yellowthroat, Geothlypis trichas, permanent and summer range
- Hooded warbler, Wilsonia ciltrina (A)
- (SW) Wilson's warbler, Wilsonia pusilla (A) from the eastern US (summer range)
- Painted redstart, Myioborus pictus, intermittent yearlong visitor
- (* SW) Yellow-breasted chat, Icteria virens, summer, (April) May–September

Three species are mainly summer residents: Lucy's warbler, the common yellowtail and yellow-breasted chat.

- (A) or (C) visiting warblers, etc.:
  - Blue-winged warbler, Vermivora pinus (A)
  - Golden-winged warbler, Vermivora chrysoptera (A)
  - Tennessee warbler, Vermivora peregrina (A)
  - Chestnut-sided warbler, Dendroica pensylvanica
  - Magnolia warbler, Dendroica magnolia, not observed in summer
  - Cape May warbler, Dendroica tigrina (A)
  - Black-throated blue warbler, Dendroica caerulescens
  - Black-throated green warbler, Dendroica virens, observed in October (November)
  - Yellow-throated warbler, Dendroica dominica
  - Grace's warbler, Dendroica graciae, breeds in Arizona
  - Prairie warbler, Dendroica discolor (A)
  - Palm warbler, Dendroica palmarum
  - Bay-breasted warbler, Dendroica castanea
  - Blackpoll warbler, Dendroica striata
  - Prothonotary warbler, Prothonotaria citrea (C)
  - Worm-eating warbler, Helmitheros vermivorus
  - Ovenbird, Seiurus aurocapillus (C)
  - Northern waterthrush, Seiurus noveboracensis
  - Louisiana waterthrush, Seiurus motacilla
  - Kentucky warbler, Oporornis formosus
  - Hooded warbler, Wilsonia citrina
  - Painted redstart, Myioborus pictus, breeds in east and southeast Arizona

== Bananaquit ==
Order: Passeriformes Family: Coerebidae

The bananaquit is a small passerine bird. It has a slender, curved bill, adapted to taking nectar from flowers. It is the only member of the genus Coereba (Vieillot, 1809) and the family Coerebidae. The bananaquit is found in southern Mexico and is only occasional in the USA.

- Bananaquit, Coereba flaveola (C)

== Tanagers ==
Order: Passeriformes Family: Thraupidae

The tanagers are a large group of small to medium-sized passerine birds restricted to the New World, mainly in the tropics. Many species are brightly colored. They are seed eaters, but their preference tends towards fruit and nectar. Most have short, rounded wings. There are 256 species worldwide and 6 North American species.

- Hepatic tanager, Piranga flava, (summer range and permanent), E of Yuma County
- (* SW) Summer tanager, -Piranga rubra, summer range
- Scarlet tanager, Piranga olivacea (C) (observed in Oct)
- Western tanager, Piranga ludoviciana, summer range. N and E Az

== New World sparrows ==
Order: Passeriformes Family: Passerellidae

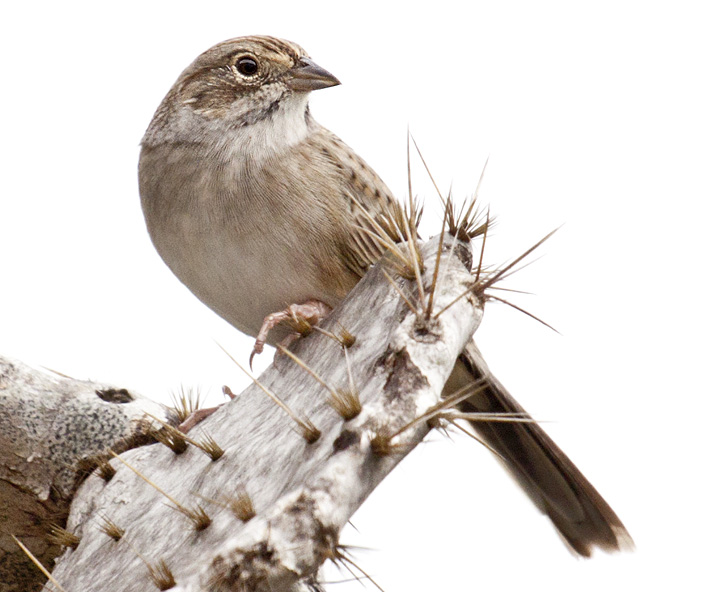
Cassin's sparrow (Peucaea cassinii)

Until 2017, these species were considered part of the family Emberizidae. Most of the species are known as sparrows, but these birds are not closely related to the Old World sparrows which are in the family Passeridae. Many of these have distinctive head patterns. Note: 29 species are listed for SW Arizona; about a third range into the southwest, about 1/3 are common to the southeast Arizona biome and the other third are mountainous, or Mexican–ranging, or range north, or west to California, but all have southwest Arizona in or adjacent in the range maps.

- Green-tailed towhee, Pipilo chlorurus ---(winter range)
- Spotted towhee, Pipilo maculatus ---(winter range)
- (SW) –Canyon towhee, Pipilo fuscus, ---Central Arizona to SE Arizona biome)
- (* SW) –Abert's towhee, Pipilo aberti ---(Arizona's SW&S-Lower Desert-"exclusive")
- Rufous-winged sparrow, Aimophila carpalis, ---(SE Arizona biome)
- Cassin's sparrow, Peucaea cassinii, (C)
- Botteri's sparrow, Aimophila botterii, ---SE Arizona biome and –Summer Range– (locales)
- (SW) –Rufous-crowned sparrow, Aimophila ruficeps, ---Permanent: towards Central Arizona
- Five-striped sparrow, Aimophila quinquestriata, ---SE Arizona biome and –Summer Range– (locales)
- Chipping sparrow, Spizella passerina, ---(winter range)
- Brewer's sparrow, Spizella breweri, ---(winter range)
- (SW) Black-chinned sparrow, Spizella atrogularis (C)
- Vesper sparrow, Pooecetes gramineus, ---(winter range)
- (* SW) Lark sparrow, Chondestes grammacus, -- 1-(winter range) and 2-permanent
- (* SW) Black-throated sparrow, Amphispiza bilineata ---(summer: an intense ground searcher, in small highly energized groups–also seeking water.)
  - Only Abert's towhee, lark sparrow, song sparrow and the black-throated sparrow are summer residents.
- Sage sparrow, Amphispiza belli, ---(winter range)
- Lark bunting, Calamospiza melanocorys, ---SE Arizona biome, (winter range)
- Savannah sparrow, Passerculus sandwichensis, ---(winter range)
- (SW) Grasshopper sparrow, Ammodramus savannarum, ---(winter range): Arizona-Mex Border, N Mexico and Baja Calif. Norte
- Baird's sparrow, Ammodramus bairdii, ---SE Arizona biome, (winter range) (extreme: localized)
- Fox sparrow, Passerella iliaca, ---(winter range)
- (* SW) Song sparrow, Melospiza melodia, ---Permanent, and: (winter range)
- Lincoln's sparrow, Melospiza lincolnii, ---(winter range)
- Swamp sparrow, Melospiza georgiana, ---(extreme SE Arizona biome)
- White-throated sparrow, Zonotrichia albicollis, ---SE Arizona biome, (winter range)
- sw–06 White-crowned sparrow, Zonotrichia leucophrys, ---(winter range)
- Dark-eyed junco, Junco hyemalis, ---(winter range)
- (SW) Yellow-eyed junco, Junco phaeonotus, ---Permanent: SE Arizona biome

== Longspurs and snow buntings ==
Order: Passeriformes Family: Calcariidae

The Calcariidae are a group of passerine birds that had been traditionally grouped with the New World sparrows, but differ in a number of respects and are usually found in open grassy areas.

- Thick-billed longspur, Rhynchophanes mccownii, (C) SE Arizona biome
- Lapland longspur, Calcarius lapponicus, (Occasional-winter)
- Chestnut-collared longspur, Calcarius ornatus, ---(winter range)

== Cardinals, saltators and grosbeaks ==
Order: Passeriformes Family: Cardinalidae

The cardinals are a family of robust, seed-eating birds with strong bills. They are typically associated with open woodland. The sexes usually have distinct plumages. There are 43 species worldwide and 13 North American species.

- (–L–) (* SW) Northern cardinal, Cardinalis cardinalis, [Permanent in SE Arizona biome]
- Pyrrhuloxia, Cardinalis sinuatus, [Permanent in SE Arizona biome]
- Yellow grosbeak, Pheucticus chrysopeplus, (–L–)Occasional in locales, (from SE Arizona biome)
- Black-headed grosbeak, Pheucticus melanocephalus, summers: N Az, E Az and SE Az biome
- (* SW) Blue grosbeak, Passerina caerulea, (summer range)
- Lazuli bunting, Passerina amoena, (–Summer Range– in N Mex, E coast of Gulf of Cal and west range in SE Arizona biome)
- (* SW) Indigo bunting, Passerina cyanea, (summer range)
- Varied bunting, Passerina versicolor, SE Arizona biome, (summer range)

== Icterids ==
Order: Passeriformes Family: Icteridae

The icterids are a group of small to medium-sized, often colorful passerine birds restricted to the New World and include: the grackles, New World blackbirds and New World orioles. Most species have black as a predominant plumage color, often enlivened by yellow, orange or red. There are 98 species worldwide and 25 North American species. The 11 listed Icterids, are mostly common and breeding species in the Lower Colorado River Valley (LCRV).

- (* SW) Red-winged blackbird, Agelaius phoeniceus
- Eastern meadowlark, Sturnella magna; two westward range–extensions, the northerly into the SE Arizona biome.
- (* SW) Western meadowlark, Sturnella neglecta
- (* SW) Yellow-headed blackbird, Xanthocephalus xanthocephalus
- (SW) Rusty blackbird, Euphagus carolinus
- (SW) Brewer's blackbird, Euphagus cyanocephalus
- (* SW) Great-tailed grackle, Quiscalus mexicanus, Perm,-Non-migrating
- Common grackle, Quiscalus quiscula, (C) (minor vagrant from SE US)
- (* SW) Bronzed cowbird, Molothrus aeneus
- (* SW) Brown-headed cowbird, Molothrus ater

== Fringilline finches, cardueline finches and allies ==
Order: Passeriformes Family: Fringillidae

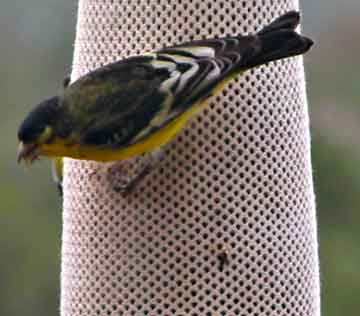
Lesser goldfinch (Spinus psaltria)

Finches are seed-eating passerine birds, that are small to moderately large and have a strong beak, usually conical and in some species very large. All have twelve tail feathers and nine primaries. These birds have a bouncing flight with alternating bouts of flapping and gliding on closed wings, and most sing well. There are 137 species worldwide and ?20 North American species. The 9 listed Finches and allies, are mostly winter residents or permanent.

- (SW) Purple finch, Haemorhous purpureus, (winters), Oct–Jan
- Cassin's finch, Haemorhous cassinii, (–Intermittent winter range–), Nov–Dec
- (* SW) House finch, Haemorhous mexicanus, Permanent
- Red crossbill, Loxia curvirostra, (C) Permanent: mountains: northern and eastern Arizona (Observed in the lower Colorado River Valley from Aug–Dec)
- (SW) Pine siskin, Spinus pinus, (winter range)
- (* SW) Lesser goldfinch, Spinus psaltria, Permanent
- (* SW) Lawrence's goldfinch, Spinus lawrencei, (winter range)- (–locales–)
- (SW) American goldfinch, Spinus tristis, (winter range)
- (SW) Evening grosbeak, Hesperiphona vespertina, Permanent: mountains: NE (Four Corners), E mountains and SE Arizona biome, (Observed in Lower Colorado River Valley from Oct–Nov)

== Old World sparrows ==
Order: Passeriformes Family: Passeridae

Old World sparrows are small passerine birds. In general, sparrows tend to be small plump brownish or grayish birds with short tails and short powerful beaks. Sparrows are seed-eaters, but they also climb and chase and consume small insects. There are 35 species worldwide and 2 North American species. The house sparrow is common in SW Arizona.

- (* SW) House sparrow, Passer domesticus– (I)
- Eurasian tree sparrow, Passer montanus– (I)

== See also ==
- List of birds of Arizona
- List of birds of the Sonoran Desert
- Tucson Bird Count
