= List of birds of the Sonoran Desert =

This list of birds of the Sonoran Desert includes all bird species endemic to the Sonoran Desert, and related areas; (a few species listed are only "native" and have a larger continental range). They are retrieved from the List of birds of Yuma County, Arizona, though not exclusively.

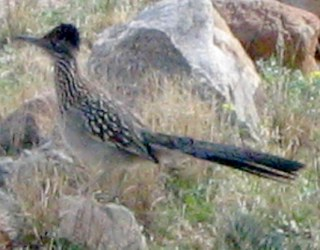
Greater roadrunner

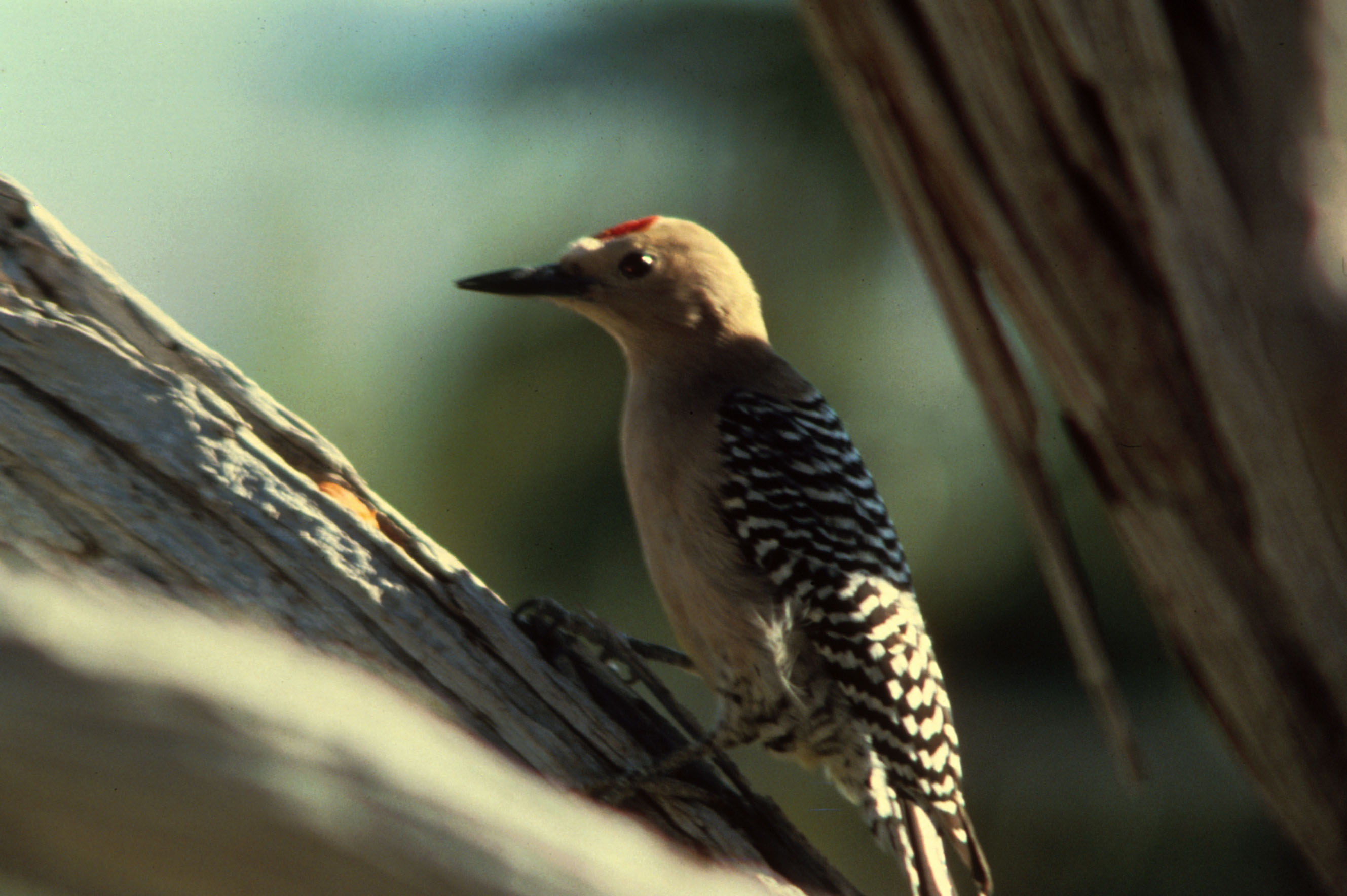
Gila woodpecker Melanerpes uropygialis

== Southwest region ==
The listed birds are based on the southern section of the Lower Colorado River Valley, from Yuma County and La Paz County, to the Bill Williams River, (and by extension to Needles, California/Topock, Arizona). The Colorado River borders the higher elevation Mojave Desert to the northwest (Needles and Las Vegas), the Colorado Desert–(extension of Sonoran Desert) on the southwest and west, and the deserts of the Sonoran Desert to the east, the Yuma Desert, Lechuguilla Desert, and the Tule Desert.

Bolded species are exclusive to the hottest deserts (southwestern Arizona; Baja California; northern Mexico; and the Carrizo Plain).

- Costa's hummingbird, Calypte costae
- Gambel's quail, Callipepla gambelii
- Black rail, Laterallus jamaicensis
  - SW Ariz Sonoran desert, but also other locales.
- Greater roadrunner, Geococcyx californianus, (Extensive range beyond the Sonoran Desert)
- **Gila woodpecker**, Melanerpes uropygialis
- Gilded flicker, Colaptes chrysoides
- Vermilion flycatcher, Pyrocephalus rubinus
- Brown-crested flycatcher, Myiarchus tyrannulus
- Black-tailed gnatcatcher, Polioptila melanura
  - Also ranges E and S into the Chihuahuan Desert, Texas and Mexico.
- Crissal thrasher, Toxostoma crissale, ranges S into Central Mexico
- Curve-billed thrasher, Toxostoma curvirostre
- **Le Conte's thrasher**, Toxostoma lecontei, Sonoran, and ranges into S Nevada–(locally: the Carrizo Plain, N of Los Angeles)
- Phainopepla, Phainopepla nitens
  - Also ranges into California's San Joaquin Valley.
- Lucy's warbler, Oreothlypis luciae
  - Exclusive in Sonoran Desert, Summer Range, (includes the Colorado River Valley, the Grand Canyon, and S Nevada).
- **Abert's towhee**, Melozone aberti, (–Sonoran Desert–)
- Black-throated sparrow, Amphispiza bilineata
  - Permanent breeding range, (but ranges E to Texas, and also Summer ranges to very S Oregon, very S Idaho).
- Yellow-headed blackbird, Xanthocephalus xanthocephalus
  - Permanent in S Lower Colorado River Valley
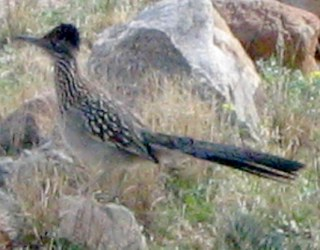
Greater
roadrunner

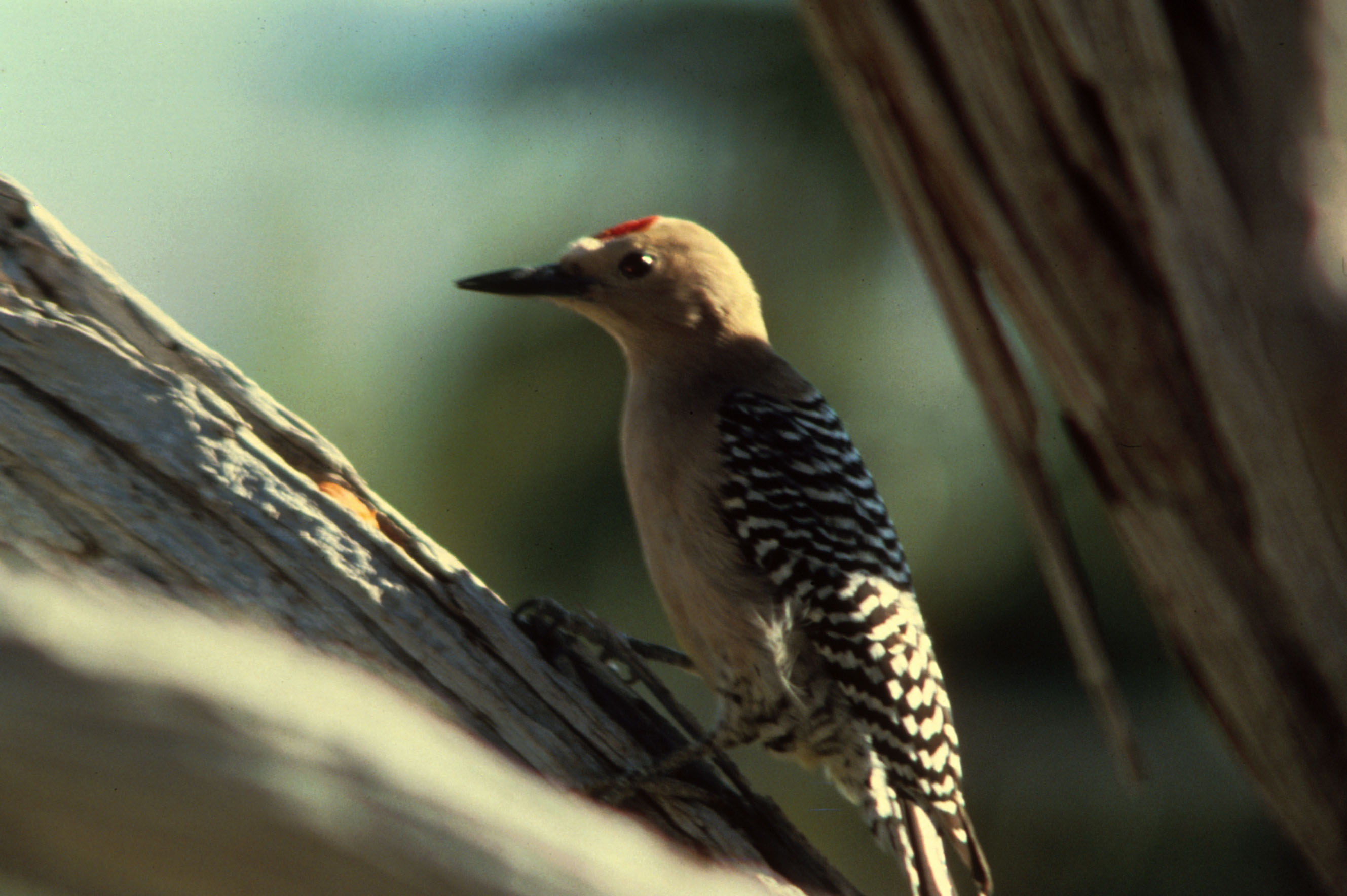
Gila woodpecker
Melanerpes uropygialis

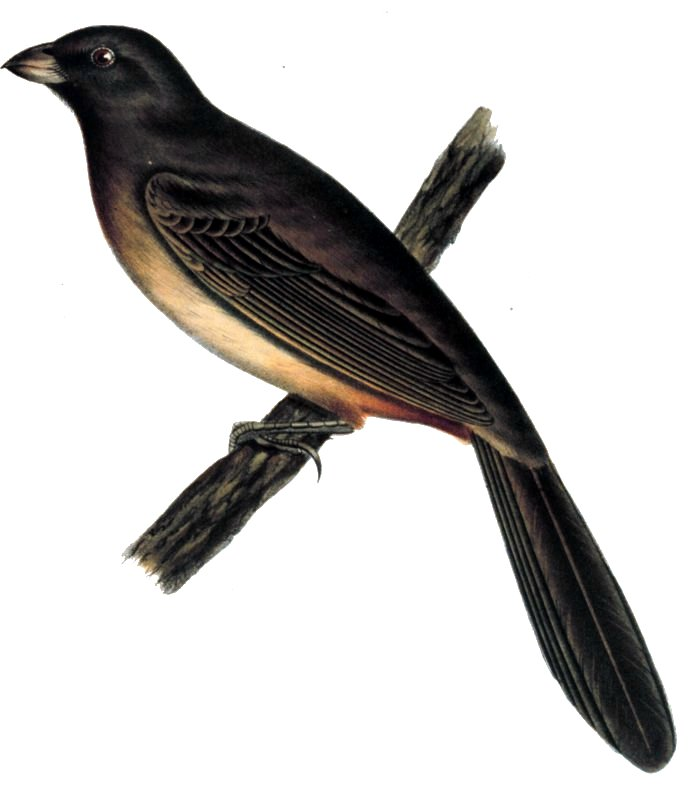
Abert's towhee
Melozone aberti

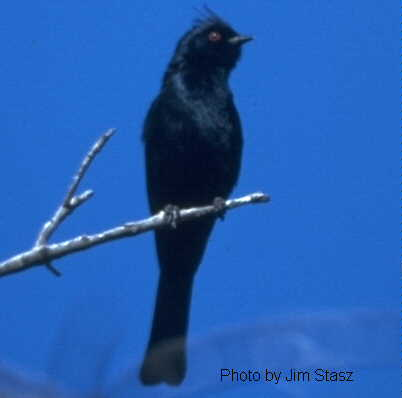
Phainopepla
Phainopepla nitens

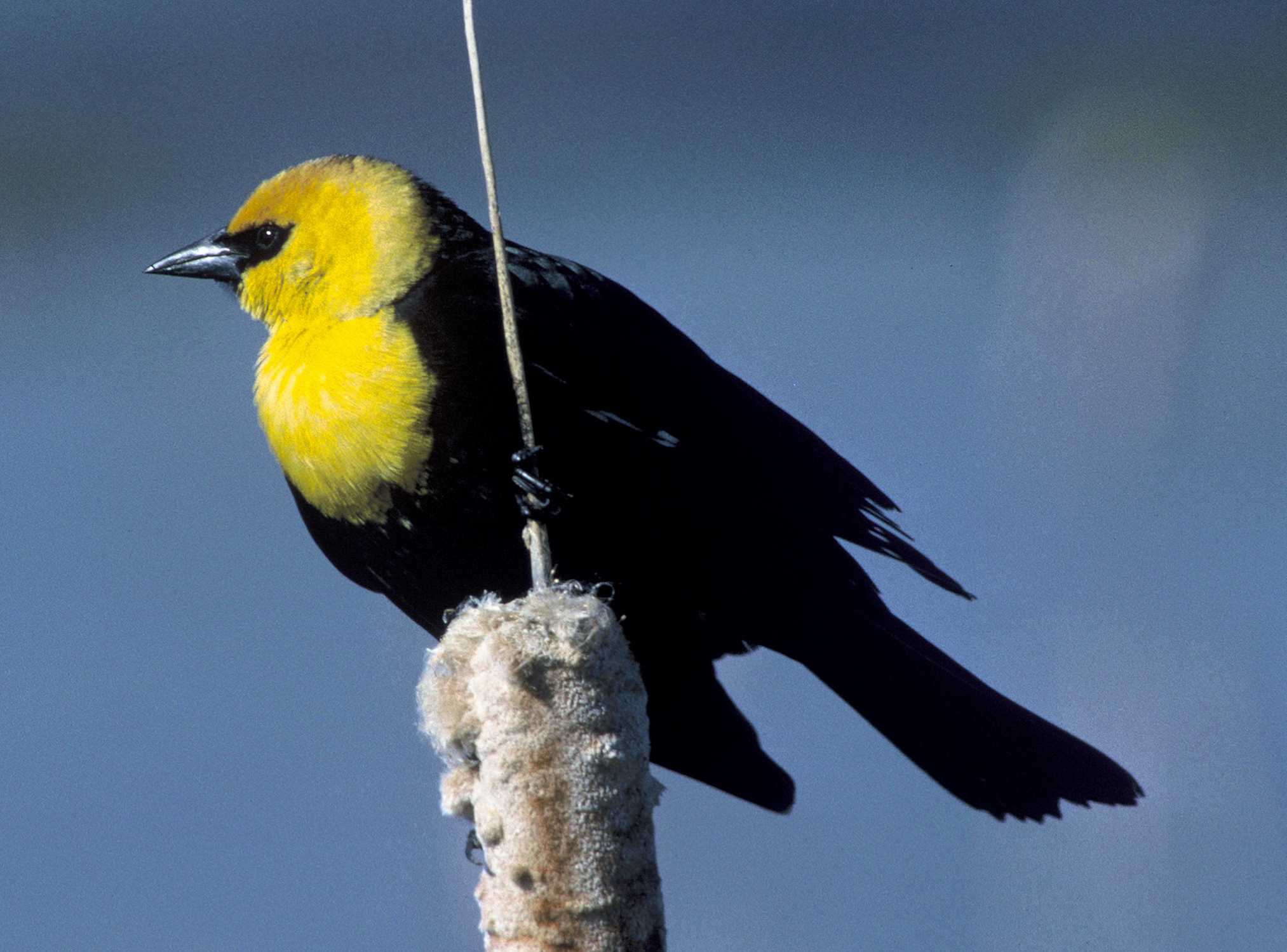
Yellow-headed
Blackbird
Xanthocephalus
xanthocephalus

== Southeast region ==
The southeast Arizona region is defined by: 1–the mountains of eastern Arizona, extending into western and southwestern New Mexico; 2–the sky islands defined by the NW–to–SE trending mountain ranges (formerly of the Basin and Range geology), also called regionally the Madrean sky islands; and 3–the northernmost extension of the western spine mountain range of Mexico, the Sierra Madre Occidental (West). The result is a biome region particular to its: geographic locale, elevation, and proximity to flyways, namely for the mountains (of Mexico, the United States, and to Canada), and for the proximity to the Gulf of California, Gulf of Mexico, and the Pacific Ocean.

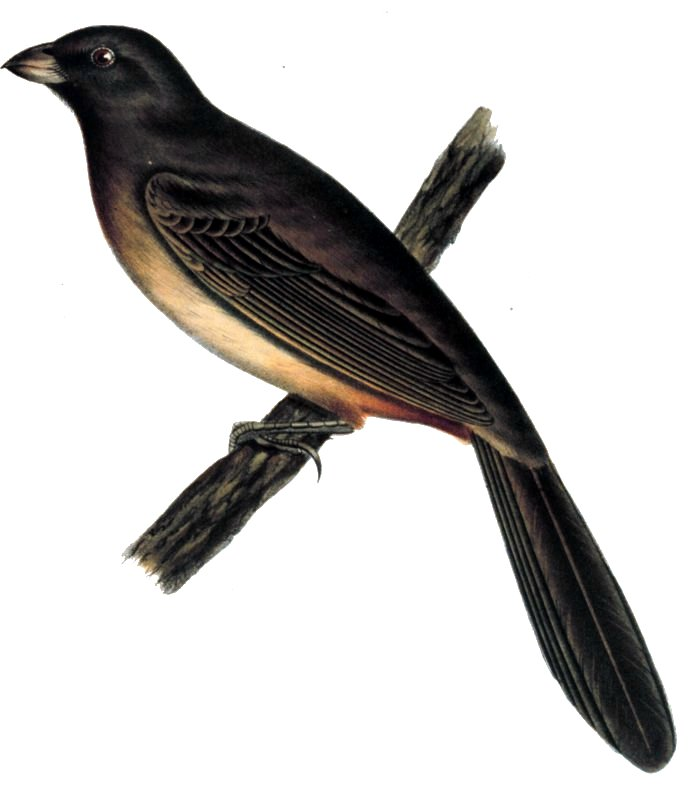
Abert's towhee
Melozone aberti

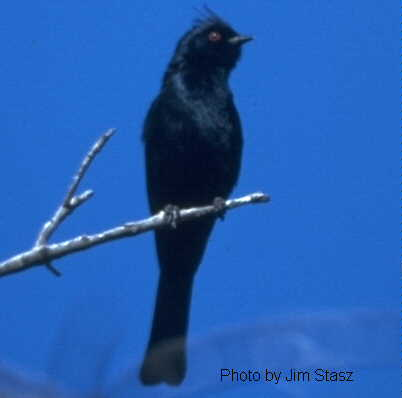
Phainopepla
Phainopepla nitens

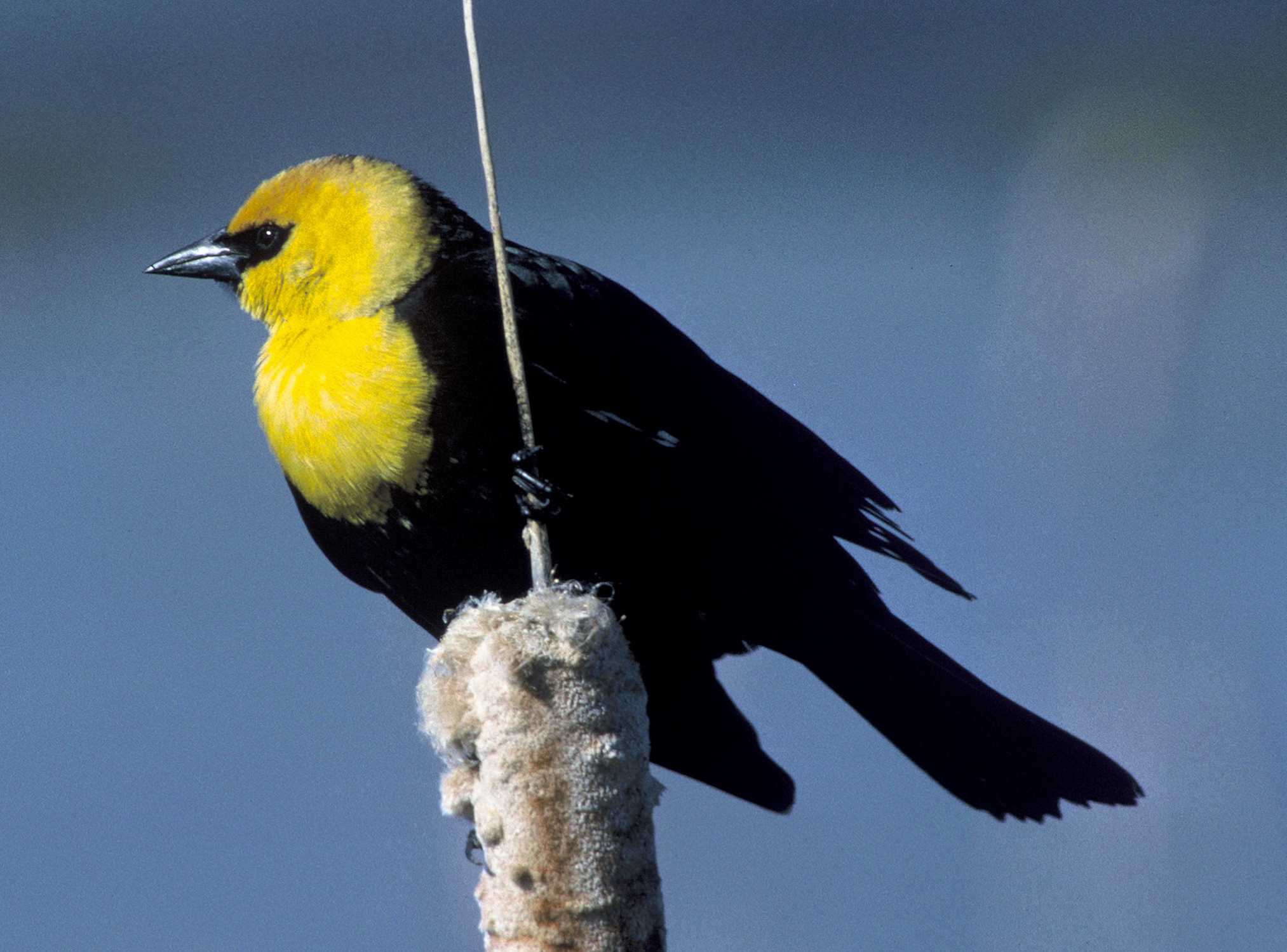
Yellow-headed
Blackbird
Xanthocephalus
xanthocephalus

== See also ==
- List of birds of Arizona
