= Temple Allen Industries =

Robotics company

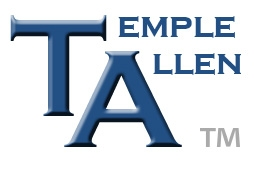
- Industry: Manufacturing
- Founded: 2003
- Headquarters: Rockville, Maryland, United States
- Area served: Worldwide
- Products: Easily Manipulated Mechanical Arm
- Website: www.templeallen.com

Temple Allen Industries (TAI) is the manufacturer of the EMMA (Easily Manipulated Mechanical Arm), designed for use in the aerospace, defense, and marine markets. TAI was founded in 2003 and is headquartered in Rockville, MD.

== History ==
In 2004, Temple Allen Industries installed the first EMMA system for performing surface preparation in the aerospace industry. The system has been purchased and implemented by several leading aerospace companies, including Boeing, which has deployed the system at their Everett and Renton facilities. EMMA has also been featured in aviation industry publications, such as Aviation Maintenance, as a novel maintenance tool.
