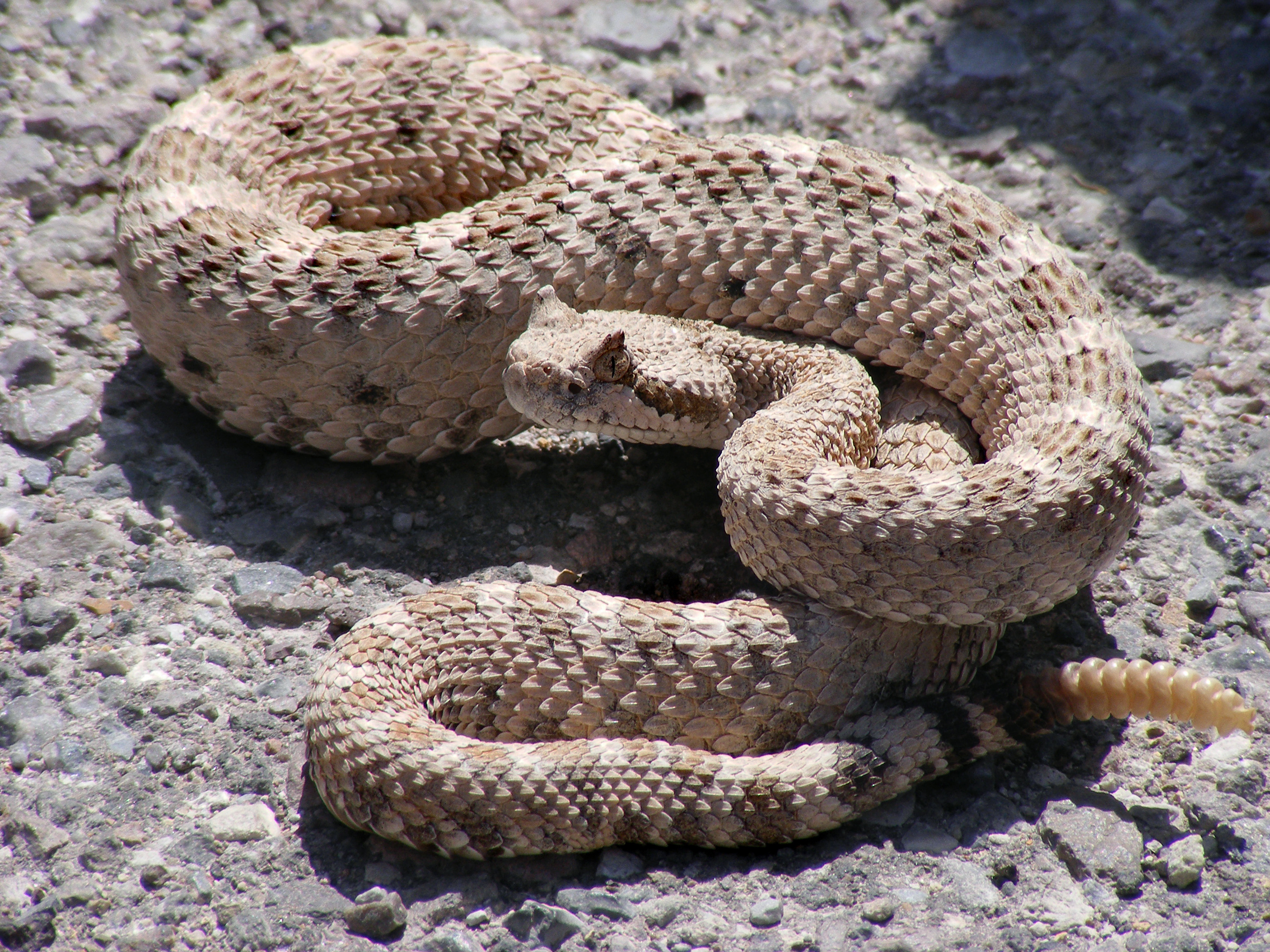
- Death Valley National Park

Conservation status
- Least Concern (IUCN 3.1)

Scientific classification
- Kingdom: Animalia
- Phylum: Chordata
- Class: Reptilia
- Order: Squamata
- Suborder: Serpentes
- Family: Viperidae
- Genus: Crotalus
- Species: C. cerastes

Binomial name
- Crotalus cerastes Hallowell, 1854
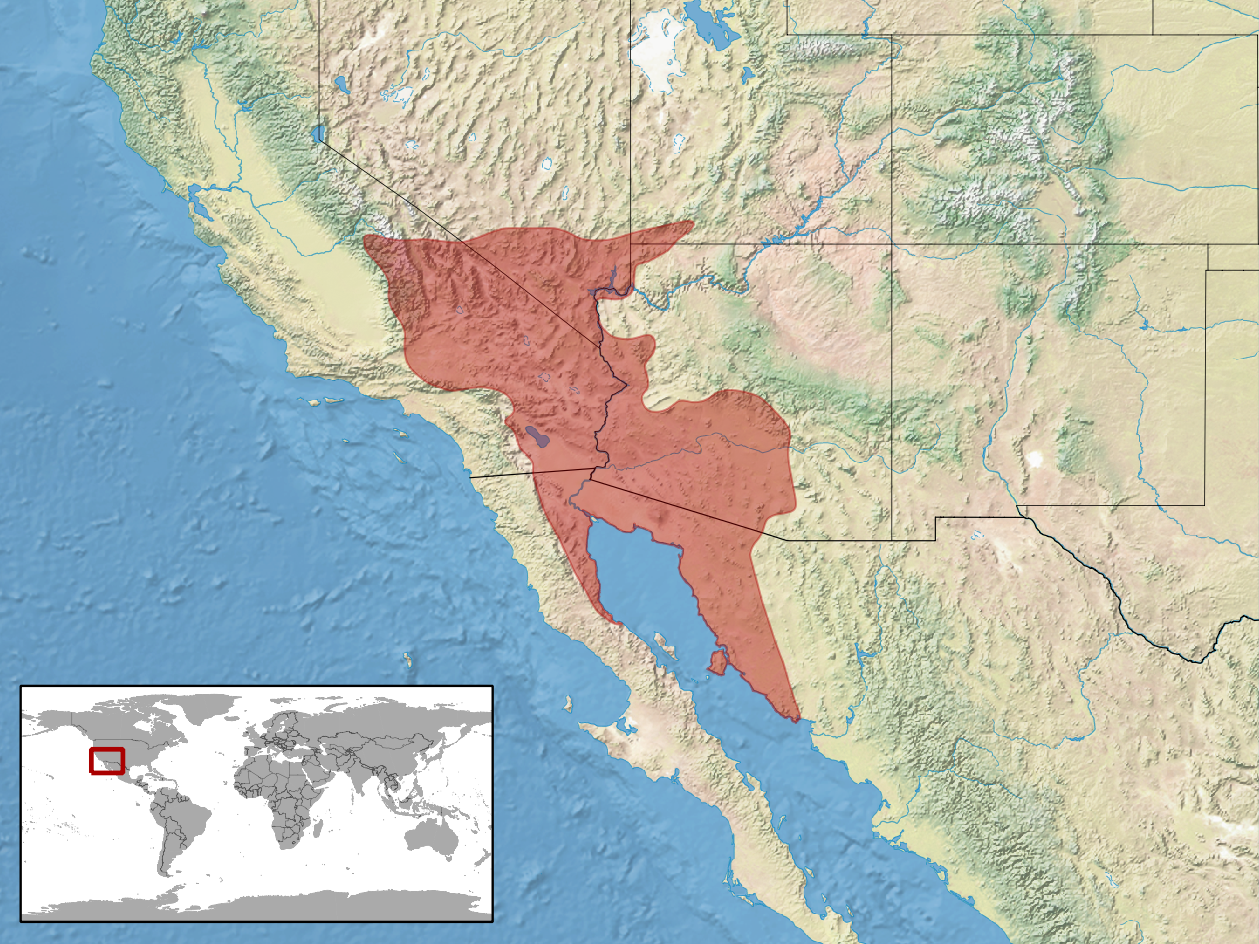

Synonyms
- Crotalus cerastes Hallowell, 1854; C[audisona]. cerastes — Cope, 1867; Caudisona (Aechmophrys) cerastes — Coues in Wheeler, 1875; Aechmophrys cerastes — Coues in Wheeler, 1875; Crotalus cerastes — Boulenger, 1896; Crotalus cerastes [cerastes] — Klauber, 1944

= Crotalus cerastes =

Species of snake

Crotalus cerastes, also known commonly as the horned rattlesnake, the sidewinder, and the sidewinder rattlesnake, is a species of pit viper, a venomous snake in the subfamily Crotalinae of the family Viperidae. The species is native to desert regions of the Southwestern United States and adjacent northwestern Mexico. Three subspecies are recognized as being valid.

== Description ==
A small species, adult specimens of Crotalus cerastes measure between 43 and 80 cm (17 and 31.5 in) in total length (tail included). The females are larger than the males, which is unique among United States rattlesnakes.

Usually, 21 rows of keeled dorsal scales occur midbody. Males have 141 or fewer ventral scales; females have 144 or fewer. It is sometimes referred to as the horned rattlesnake because of the raised supraocular scales above its eyes. This adaptation may help shade the eyes or prevent sand drifting over them as the snake lies almost buried in it. As only pressure on top of the horns will cause them to fold down, it is concluded that they strike against the roof of rodent burrows to protect the eyes.

The color pattern consists of a ground color that may be cream, buff, yellowish-brown, pink, or ash gray, overlaid with 28–47 dorsal blotches subrhombic or subelliptical in shape. In the nominate subspecies, the belly is white and the proximal lobe of the rattle is brown in adults. Klauber and Neill describe the ability of this species to display different coloration depending on the temperature—a process known as metachrosis.

== Common names ==
Common names for Crotalus cerastes include horned rattlesnake, sidewinder, sidewinder rattlesnake, and Mojave Desert sidewinder (for C. c. cerastes),

== Subspecies ==
Images	Subspecies	Taxon author	Common name	Geographic range
	C. c. cerastes	Hallowell, 1854	Mojave Desert sidewinder	In the United States in the desert areas from northeastern Los Angeles County and San Bernardino County, California, northward to southern Mono County, California, east across Nevada to Washington County, Utah, and south through La Paz County, Arizona, in desert lowlands at elevations between 152 and 1,829 m
	C. c. cercobombus	Savage & Cliff, 1953	Sonoran Desert sidewinder	In the United States from Yuma, Maricopa, Pima, and Pinal Counties in Arizona, southward into Sonora, Mexico
	C. c. laterorepens	Klauber, 1944	Colorado Desert sidewinder	The desert areas in the United States from central and eastern Riverside County, California, to Pinal County, Arizona, south to northwestern Sonora in Mexico, and northwest to northeastern Baja California, from the Colorado River to the desert foothills at elevations between 152 and 610 m

== Geographic distribution and habitat ==
In the Southwestern United States, Crotalus cerastes is found in the desert region of southeastern California, southern Nevada, southwestern Utah, and western Arizona. In northwestern Mexico, it is found in western Sonora and eastern Baja California.

== Conservation status ==
The species Crotalus cerastes is classified as least concern on the IUCN Red List (v3.1, 2001). Species are listed as such due to their wide distribution, presumed large population, or because they are unlikely to be declining fast enough to qualify for listing in a more threatened category. The population trend was stable when assessed in 2007.

== Behavior ==
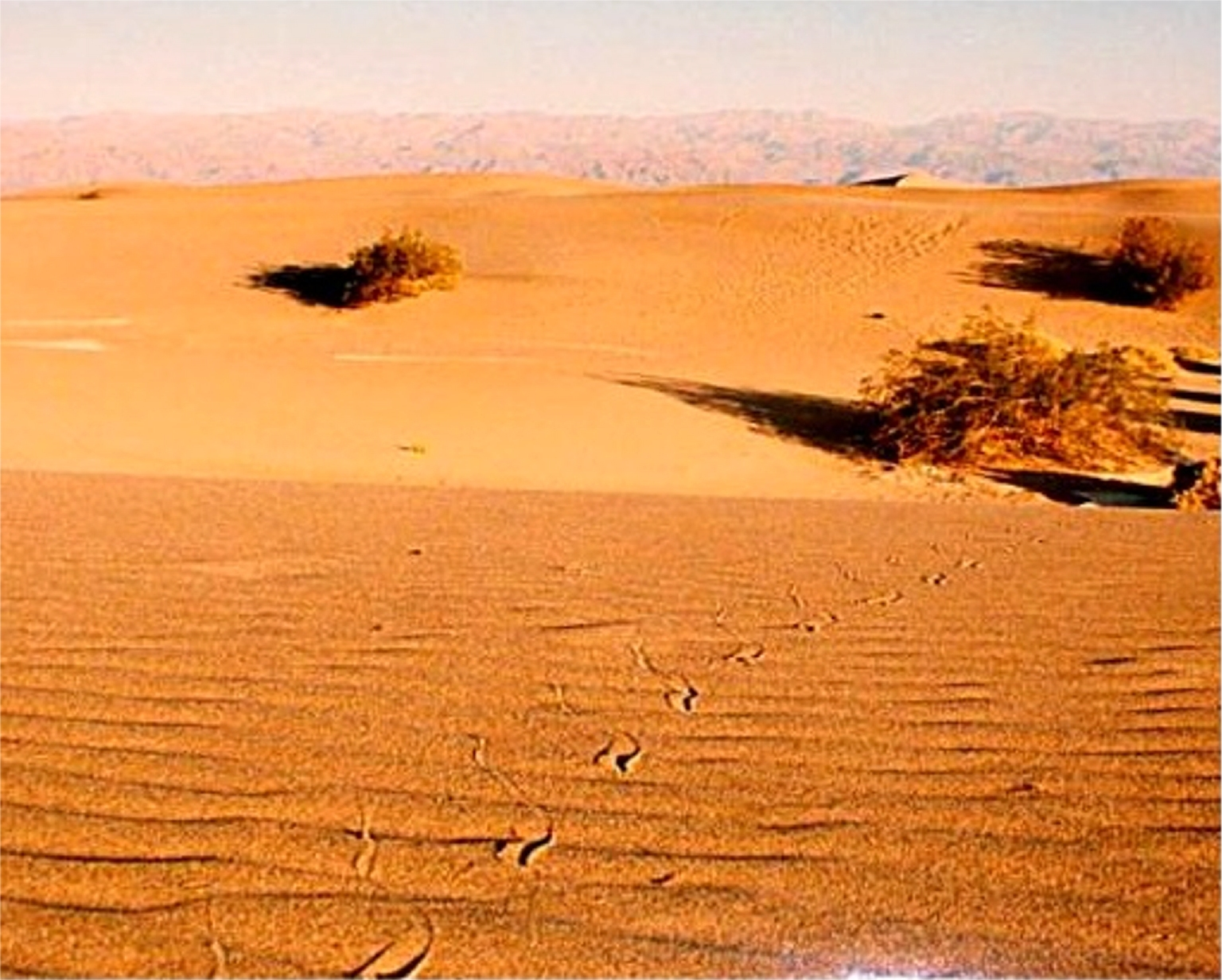
Sidewinder tracks in Death Valley National Park, showing typical J-shaped impressions

The common name sidewinder alludes to its unusual form of locomotion, which is thought to give it traction on windblown desert sand, but this peculiar locomotor specialization is used on any substrate over which the sidewinder can move rapidly. As its body progresses over loose sand, it forms a letter J-shaped impression, with the tip of the hook pointing in the direction of travel. Sidewinding is also the primary mode of locomotion in other desert sand dwellers, such as the horned adder (Bitis caudalis) and Peringuey's adder (Bitis peringueyi), but many other snakes can assume this form of locomotion when on slick substrates (e.g., mud flats). The sidewinder rattlesnake can use sidewinding to ascend sandy slopes by increasing the portion of the body in contact with the sand to match the reduced yielding force of the inclined sand, allowing it to ascend up to the maximum possible sand slope without slip. In cybernetics, incorporating this control scheme into a snakebot can enable the robot to replicate sidewinding movement. Activity range does not change with sex or body size.

The species is nocturnal during hot months and diurnal during the cooler months of its activity period, which is roughly from November to March (probably longer in the southern part of its range).

Juveniles use their tails to attract lizard prey, a behavior termed "caudal luring". Adults lose this behavior as they make the transition from lizard prey to their primary diet of desert rodents, birds, and other snakes. Sidewinder juveniles appear to mimic both life stages of lepidopterans in their luring motions. Their fast luring motions resemble the fluttering of a moth, and their slower tail movements resemble a caterpillar. Both movements have been observed to attract prey lizards.

Neonatal sidewinders engage in a remarkable behavioral homeothermy that has not been observed in any other species of snake. Following birth, the neonates mass together in their natal burrow. Most often, gravid females select an east-facing, small-diameter rodent burrow for giving birth. For the first week or so of their lives, neonatal sidewinders plug the entrance to this burrow during daylight hours, forming a dynamic multiple-individual mass that takes advantage of the hot exterior environment and the cool interior of the burrow to maintain an average aggregate temperature of 32 °C (the optimal temperature for shedding). The dynamic mass of neonates modifies the thermal environment at the burrow entrance such that the young can occupy a location that would ordinarily become lethally hot for an individual neonate (or even an adult). Because of the constant movements of the neonates, the aggregate assumes stable temperature properties reminiscent of a homeothermic organism (i.e., maintains tight temperature tolerance ± 2 °C).

== Reproduction ==
An adult female Crotalus cerastes may produce up to 18 young, with an average of about 10 per litter. Like most other viperids, the young are born enveloped in thin embryonic membranes, from which they emerge shortly after being expelled from the mother. The young stay with their mother in a burrow for 7–10 days, shed for the first time, then leave their natal burrow. During this time, the mother is thought to guard and protect them from predators.

Both sexes of the sidewinder mature at 2–3 years of age, are capable of reproducing annually, and give birth to live young. Some females skip reproductive opportunities. Some might even skip two years if the food supply is scarce. Sidewinders mate in April through May and sometimes in fall. When the male and female mate, the male snake crawls along the female's back, rubbing her with his chin to stimulate or arouse her. The male then will wrap his tail around her tail, and then will try to bring their cloacae together. The cloaca is the posterior body opening through which snakes both excrete waste and reproduce. If the female wants to mate, she lifts her tail and allows him to mate with her. The snakes can mate for several hours, and if one of the snakes decides to move, the other is dragged along. Females might mate with several males in a season. Females give birth to five to 18 young in late summer to early fall. The young are born 6–8 inches long. The birth takes only 2–3 hours altogether. Within a few minutes of being born, the newborn sidewinder escapes from a thin, transparent membrane. The young stay at their natal burrow for 7–10 days until they shed, and then they disappear and have no future contact with their mother or their littermates. While the density of sidewinders can be up to one individual per hectare, they rarely encounter each other except during mating season.

The sidewinder has an extraordinarily accelerated lifecycle, with natural life expectancies of females of about 5 years. Males may live quite a bit longer (maximum known natural lifespan of 13 years). Sidewinders can live more than 20 years when well fed in captivity (even females). Thus, energetics apparently factor heavily into natural female mortality, whereas predation might be the primary pressure on males. In the wild, females often die of exhaustion after giving birth, but the lives of sidewinders are also cut short by predation, diseases, and vehicle encounters.

== Venom ==
Crotalus cerastes is venomous, but possesses a weaker venom than many other rattlesnakes. This, together with the smaller size of its venom glands, makes it less dangerous than its larger relatives. Regardless, any rattlesnake bite can be fatal, should be taken seriously, and medical attention sought immediately.

Norris (2004) lists these venom yields: 33 mg average and 63 mg maximum (Klauber, 1956), and 30 mg average and 80 mg maximum (Glenn & Straight, 1982). Brown (1973) gives a venom yield of 33 mg (Klauber, 1956) and LD_{50} values for mice of 2.6 mg/kg IV, 3.0, 4.0, 2.3 mg/kg IP and 5.5 mg/kg SC for toxicity. With these figures, Brown calculated that the LD_{50} for an adult human being weighing 70 kg would be 385 mg (SC).

Envenomation can cause pain, swelling, hemorrhagic bleb formation, and ecchymosis (i.e., bruising). Swelling, while not particularly severe, occasionally may involve entire limbs and the trunk. Envenomation's systemic symptoms include nausea, dizziness, chills, coagulopathy (blood disorders), and shock. Klauber (1997) includes an account of a man who had been bitten on the first joint of the index finger of the right hand, with only a single fang penetrating. Although the bite was described as no more painful than a pin prick, a doctor was seen within about 25 minutes, and 10 cm^{3} of antivenin were administered. Within 2.5 hours, his entire arm was swollen and the pain was severe, "as if the arm were soaked in a bucket of boiling oil."

Ovine-derived antivenom, CroFab, for North American pit viper envenomation, has been widely available since 2001. Consultation with a local expert or regional poison control center should be obtained before administering antivenom. The previous antivenin (ACP) is no longer manufactured.

== In popular culture ==
The sidewinder was the inspiration for the AIM-9 Sidewinder's name, as both use infrared emanations to track their target.
