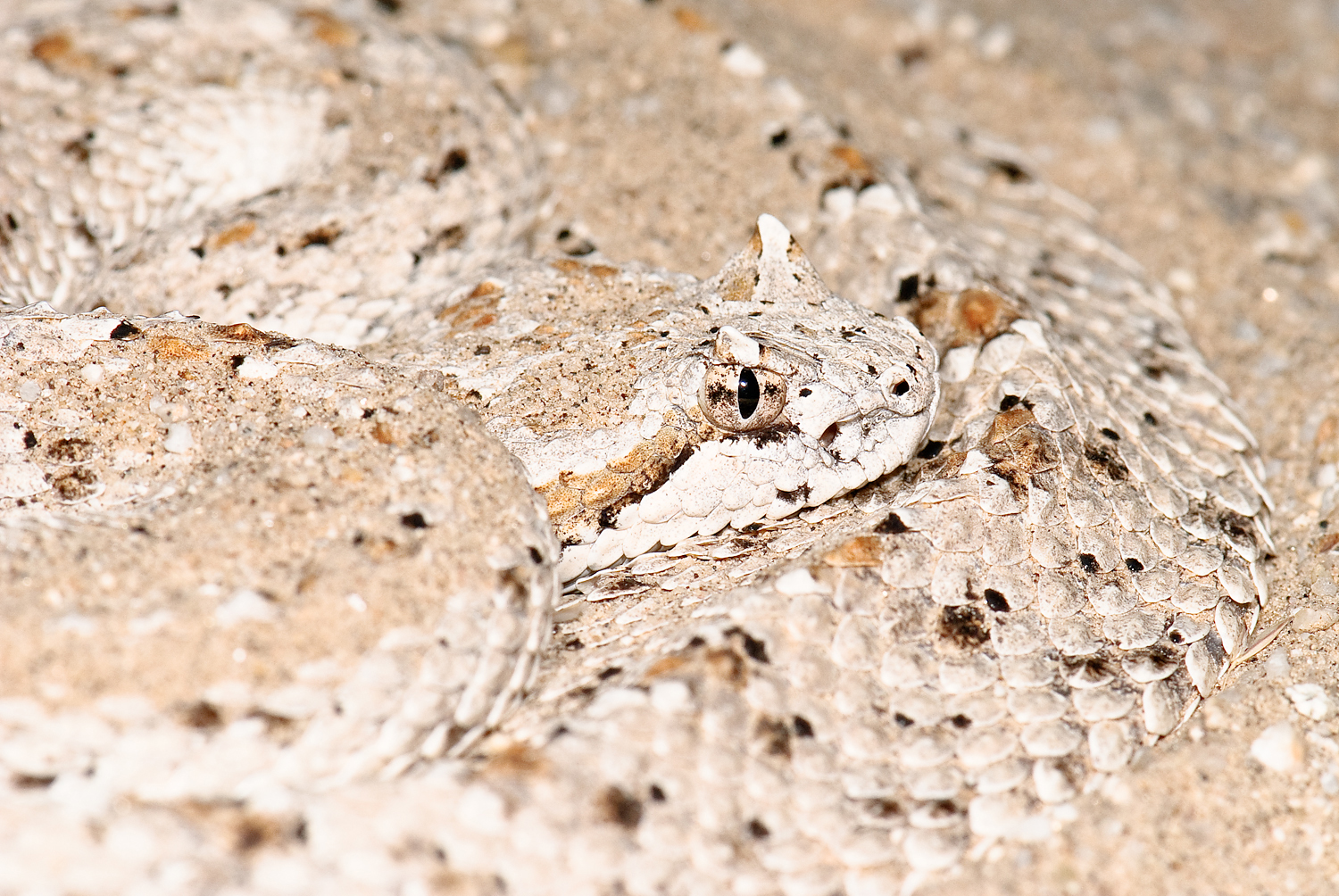

Scientific classification
- Kingdom: Animalia
- Phylum: Chordata
- Class: Reptilia
- Order: Squamata
- Suborder: Serpentes
- Family: Viperidae
- Genus: Crotalus
- Species: C. cerastes
- Subspecies: C. c. laterorepens

Trinomial name
- Crotalus cerastes laterorepens Klauber, 1944

Synonyms
- Crotalus cerastes laterorepens - Klauber, 1944

= Crotalus cerastes laterorepens =

Crotalus cerastes laterorepens Colorado Desert sidewinder

Subspecies of reptile

The Colorado Desert sidewinder (Crotalus cerastes laterorepens) is a pitviper subspecies found in an area that centers on the Sonoran Colorado Desert in Southern California. It is also native to the Sonoran Desert in the Southwestern United States and Northwestern Mexico. Like all other pitvipers, it is venomous.

== Description ==
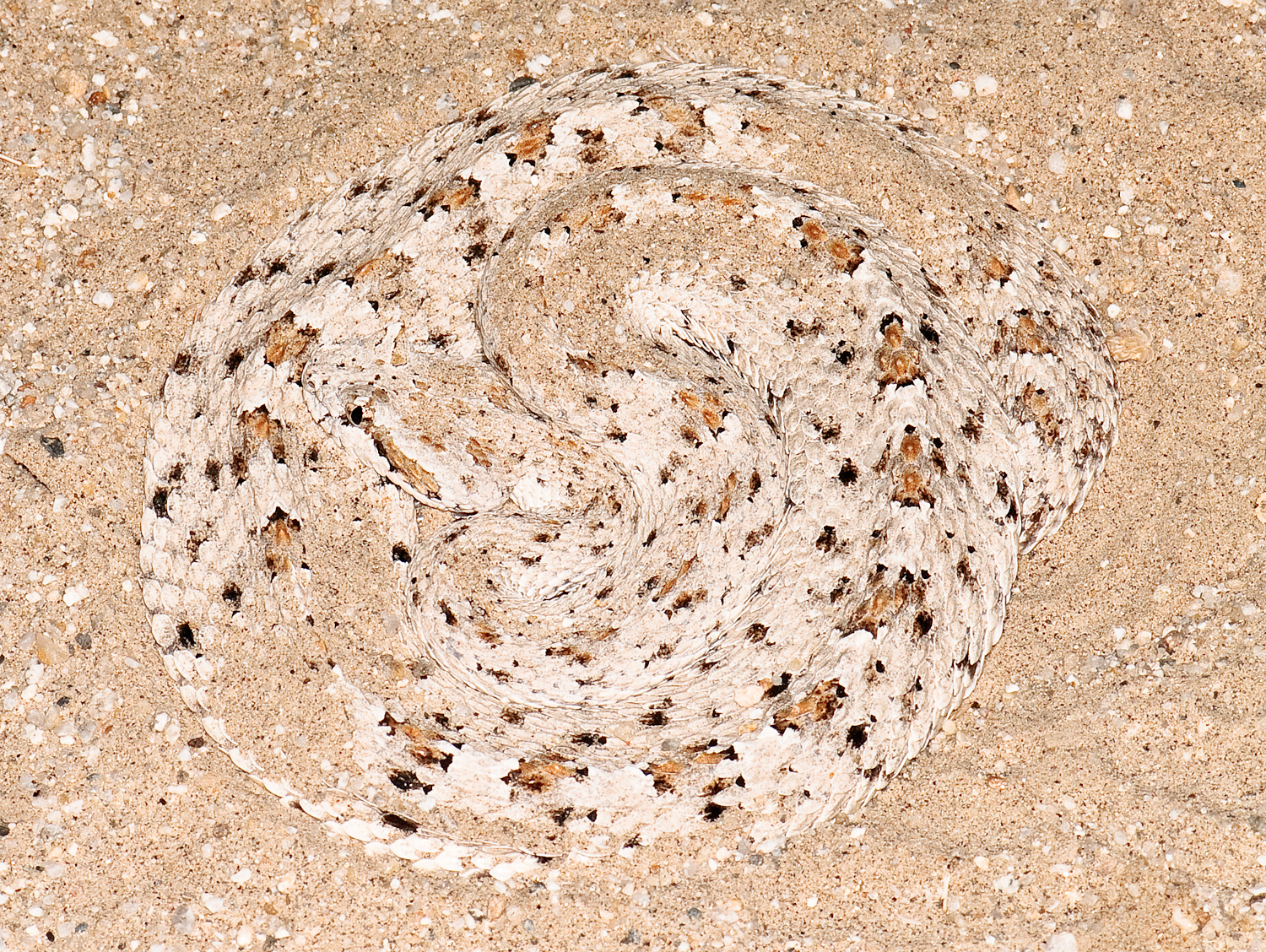
Colorado Desert sidewinder

This form of Crotalus cerastes has the following distinguishing characteristics: the proximal rattle-matrix lobe is black in adult specimens, the ventral scales number 137–151/135–154 in males/females, the subcaudals number 19-26/14-21 in males/females, and there are usually 23 rows of midbody dorsal scales.

== Geographic range ==
The Colorado Desert sidewinder is found in Sonoran Desert areas, from central and eastern Riverside County, California to Pinal County, Arizona in the United States, and south to northwestern Sonora and northeastern Baja California states in Mexico. It is in areas from the Lower Colorado River Valley to the surrounding desert foothills, at elevations between 152–610 metres (499–2,001 ft). The type locality given is "The Narrows, San Diego County, California".

Campbell and Lamar (2004) describe its range as the desert regions of southeastern California, southwestern Arizona, as well as the western panhandle region of the Sonoran Desert.
