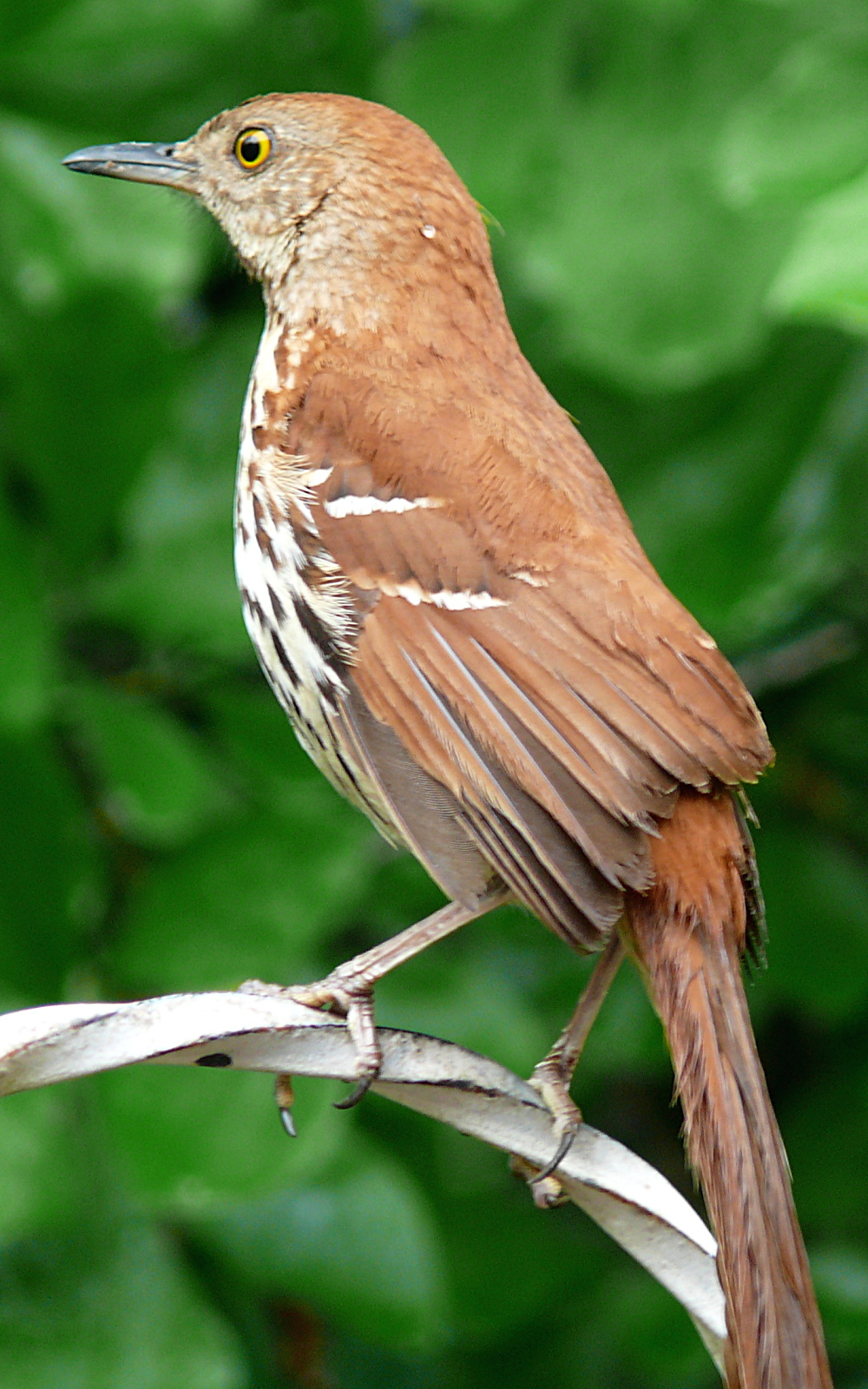
- Brown thrasher Toxostoma rufum

Scientific classification
- Kingdom: Animalia
- Phylum: Chordata
- Class: Aves
- Order: Passeriformes
- Superfamily: Muscicapoidea
- Family: Mimidae

Genera
- Allenia; Margarops; Oreoscoptes; Ramphocinclus; Toxostoma

= Thrasher =

Thrashers

New World group of passerine birds

Thrashers are a paraphyletic group of New World passerine birds related to mockingbirds and New World catbirds. Like these, they are in the family Mimidae. There are 15 species in one large and 4 monotypic genera.

The thrashers do not form a monophyletic clade but are a phenetic assemblage within the family Mimidae. The Mimidae as a whole is made up of two clades, the larger of which contains the Toxostoma thrashers and the monotypic genus Oreoscoptes, and the smaller of which contains the Ramphocinclus, Allenia, and Margarops thrashers. In the larger clade, Toxostoma is sister to all other lineages, with Oreoscoptes sister to Mimus mockingbirds. Within the smaller clade, Ramphocinclus is most closely related to the gray catbird, Dumetella carolinensis, while Allenia is sister to a clade composed of Margarops and the tremblers, genus Cinclocerthia.

Their common name describes the behaviour of these birds when searching for food on the ground: they use their long bills to "thrash" through dirt or dead leaves. All of these birds eat insects and several species also eat berries.

== Taxonomic list ==
Image	Genus	Living species
	Oreoscoptes Baird, 1858	Sage thrasher, Oreoscoptes montanus
	Toxostoma Wagler, 1831 – typical thrashers	Brown thrasher, Toxostoma rufum; Long-billed thrasher, Toxostoma longirostre; Cozumel thrasher, Toxostoma guttatum – possibly extinct (2006?); Grey thrasher, Toxostoma cinereum; Bendire's thrasher, Toxostoma bendirei; Ocellated thrasher, Toxostoma ocellatum; Curve-billed thrasher, Toxostoma curvirostre; California thrasher, Toxostoma redivivum; Crissal thrasher, Toxostoma crissale; LeConte's thrasher, Toxostoma lecontei
	Ramphocinclus Lafresnaye, 1843	White-breasted thrasher, Ramphocinclus brachyurus
	Allenia Cory, 1891	Scaly-breasted thrasher, Allenia fusca; Barbados scaly-breasted thrasher, Allenia fusca atlantica – extinct (c. 1990)
	Margarops P.L. Sclater, 1859	Pearly-eyed thrasher, Margarops fuscatus
