= Thrasher (disambiguation) =

Thrashers are a group of passerine birds related to mockingbirds and catbirds.

Thrasher may also refer to:

== Music ==
- Thrasher (album), by Brandon Flowers, 2026
- "Thrasher", a song written and performed by Neil Young, featured on the album Rust Never Sleeps, 1979
- "Thrasher", a song by Evile from the album Enter the Grave, 2007
- "Thrasher", a song by Cavalera Conspiracy from their album Blunt Force Trauma, 2011
- Someone who listens to thrash metal music

== Sports ==
- Thrasher (magazine), an American skateboarding magazine
- Thrasher Presents Skate and Destroy, a skateboarding video game
- Thrasher (wrestler), a ring name of professional wrestler Glenn Ruth
- The Atlanta Thrashers, a professional ice hockey team

== Other uses ==
- Thrasher (surname)
- HMS Thrasher, several different ships
- Thrasher (G.I. Joe), a fictional character in the G.I. Joe universe, member of the Dreadnoks
- Colloquially, a thresher (threshing machine) or combine harvester, particularly an older one
