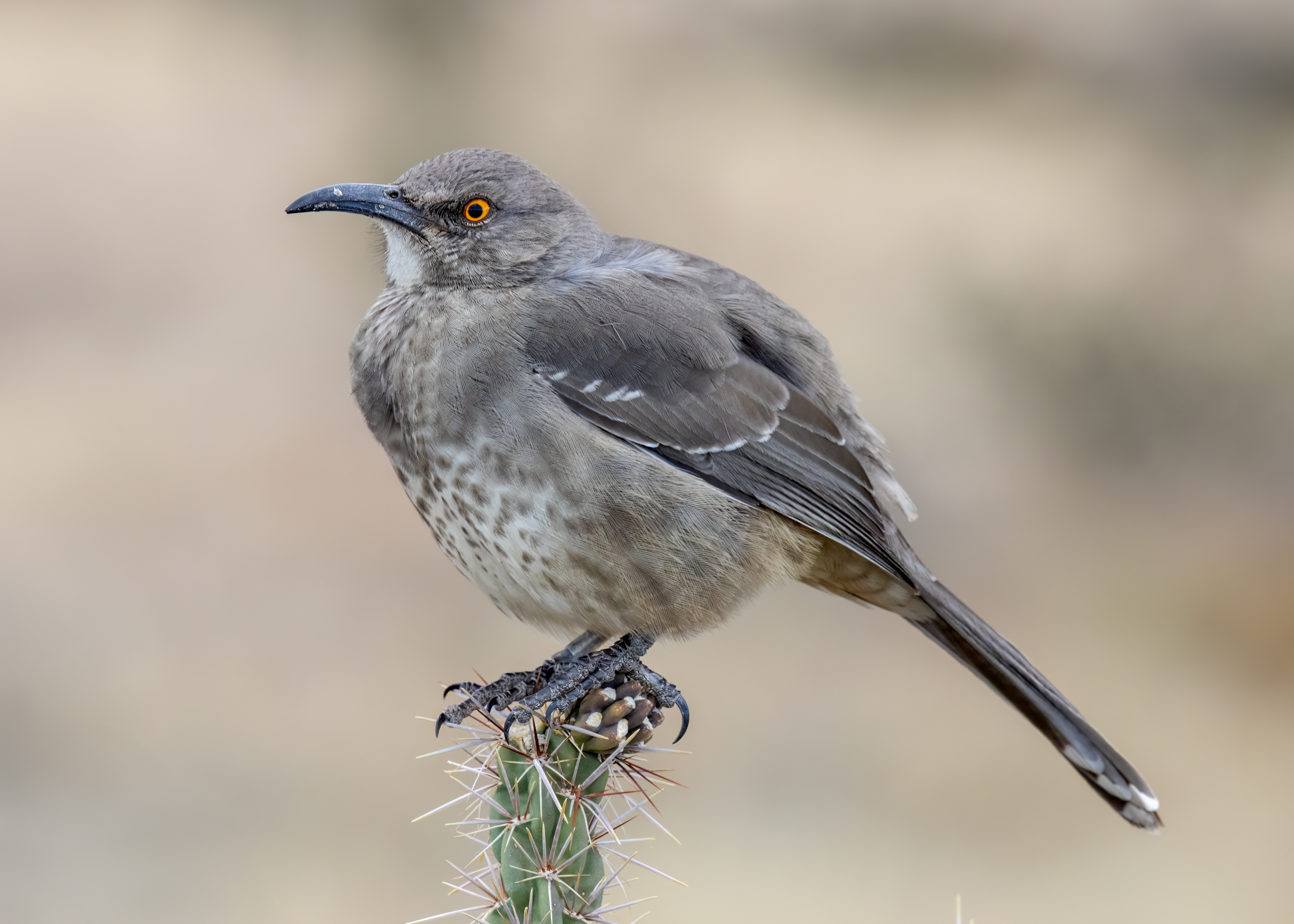

Conservation status
- Least Concern (IUCN 3.1)

Scientific classification
- Kingdom: Animalia
- Phylum: Chordata
- Class: Aves
- Order: Passeriformes
- Family: Mimidae
- Genus: Toxostoma
- Species: T. curvirostre

Binomial name
- Toxostoma curvirostre (Swainson, 1827)
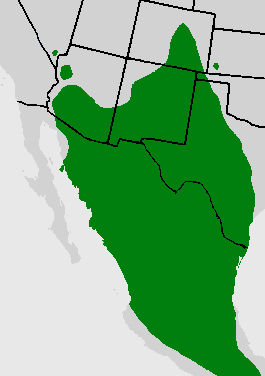

= Curve-billed thrasher =

Species of desert adapted bird

The curve-billed thrasher (Toxostoma curvirostre) is a medium-sized mimid native to most of Mexico and to the deserts of southwestern United States. It is a non-migratory species, and throughout most of its range it is the most common desert thrasher. Several subspecies have been classified since 1827, though there is no consensus on the number. Allopatric speciation is believed to have played a major role in the variations of the curve-billed. It is grey-brown overall with a slightly curved bill, and is similar in appearance to the related Bendire's thrasher. It generally resides in desert regions of the United States and Mexico, but can inhabit areas predominately populated by humans.

The demeanor of the curve-billed has been described as "shy and rather wild", but it allows humans to view it closely. It is very aggressive in driving out potential threats, whether competitors for food or predators of its chicks. The curve-billed thrasher sometimes mimics several other species, though not to the extent of other mimics. It has a variety of distinctive songs, and this extensive repertoire of melodies has led it to be known as cuicacoche (songbird) in Mexico.

== Taxonomy and systematics ==
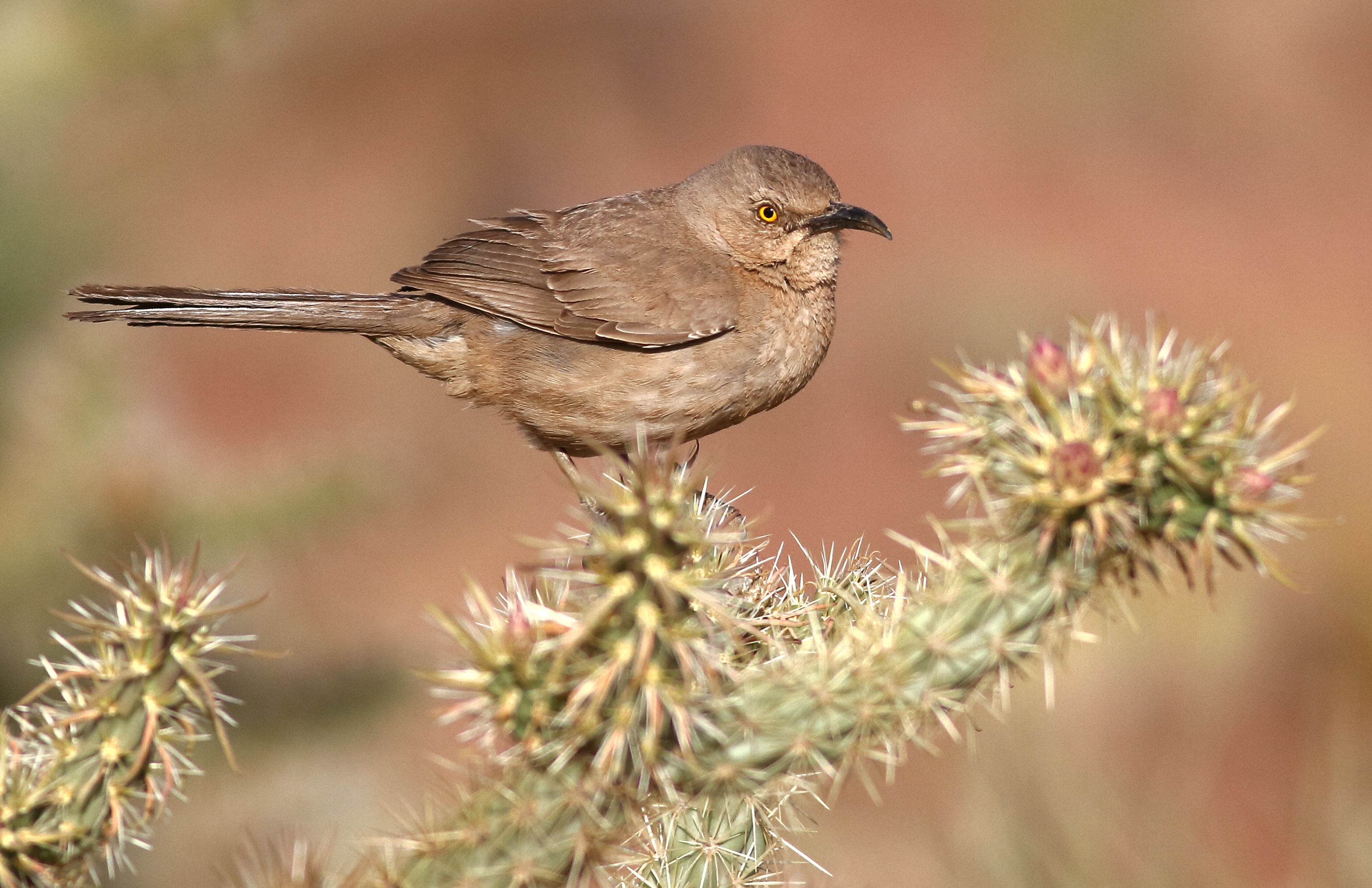
Atop a cholla cactus in Kingman, Arizona.

The species was first described as Toxostoma curvirostre by William Swainson in 1827. Since then, six subspecies have been recognized, and have been divided into two branches. Genetic research has indicated that the curve-billed thrasher is the sister species of a clade consisting of the ocellated thrasher, brown thrasher, long-billed thrasher, and Cozumel thrasher. This contrasts with an earlier suggestion that curve-billed and ocellated thrashers are closest relatives.

=== Subspecies ===
Eastern:

- Toxostoma curvirostre oberholseri (Law, 1928) – Brownsville thrasher. Generally ranges from SE Texas to NE Mexico (E Coahuila, Nuevo León and Tamaulipas).
- Toxostoma curvirostre curvirostre (Swainson, 1827) – Ranges from Central to South-Central Mexico (towards Puebla, Oaxaca, and Veracruz).
- Toxostoma curvirostre celsum (R. T. Moore, 1941) – plateau thrasher. Range spans from SE Colorado, SW Kansas, extreme NW Oklahoma to S/SE Arizona, S New Mexico and W Texas to Northern Mexico (E Chihuahua to Guanajuato and Jalisco).

Western:

- Toxostoma curvirostre insularum (van Rossem, 1930) – San Esteban thrasher. Located in the Islands of San Esteban and Tiburón off the coast of Sonora in the Gulf of California.
- Toxostoma curvirostre maculatum (Nelson, 1900) – spotted thrasher. Found in NW Mexico (S Sonora, N Sinaloa, SW Chihuahua).
- Toxostoma curvirostre occidentale (Ridgway, 1882) – Mazatlan thrasher. Located in Western Mexico (from Sinaloa and Nayarit to Jalisco).
- Toxostoma curvirostre palmeri (Coues, 1872) – Palmer's thrasher. Range is S Arizona, N Sorona and Chihuahua. This species is the representative of the western species, and was suggested to have enough variations to be considered a different species from T.c. curvirostre. T.c. palmeri was also used in a 2009 proposal by the American Ornithologists' Union to be elevated to species status, along with the eastern T.c. curvisrostre representing the eastern curve-billed thrashers.

== Description ==
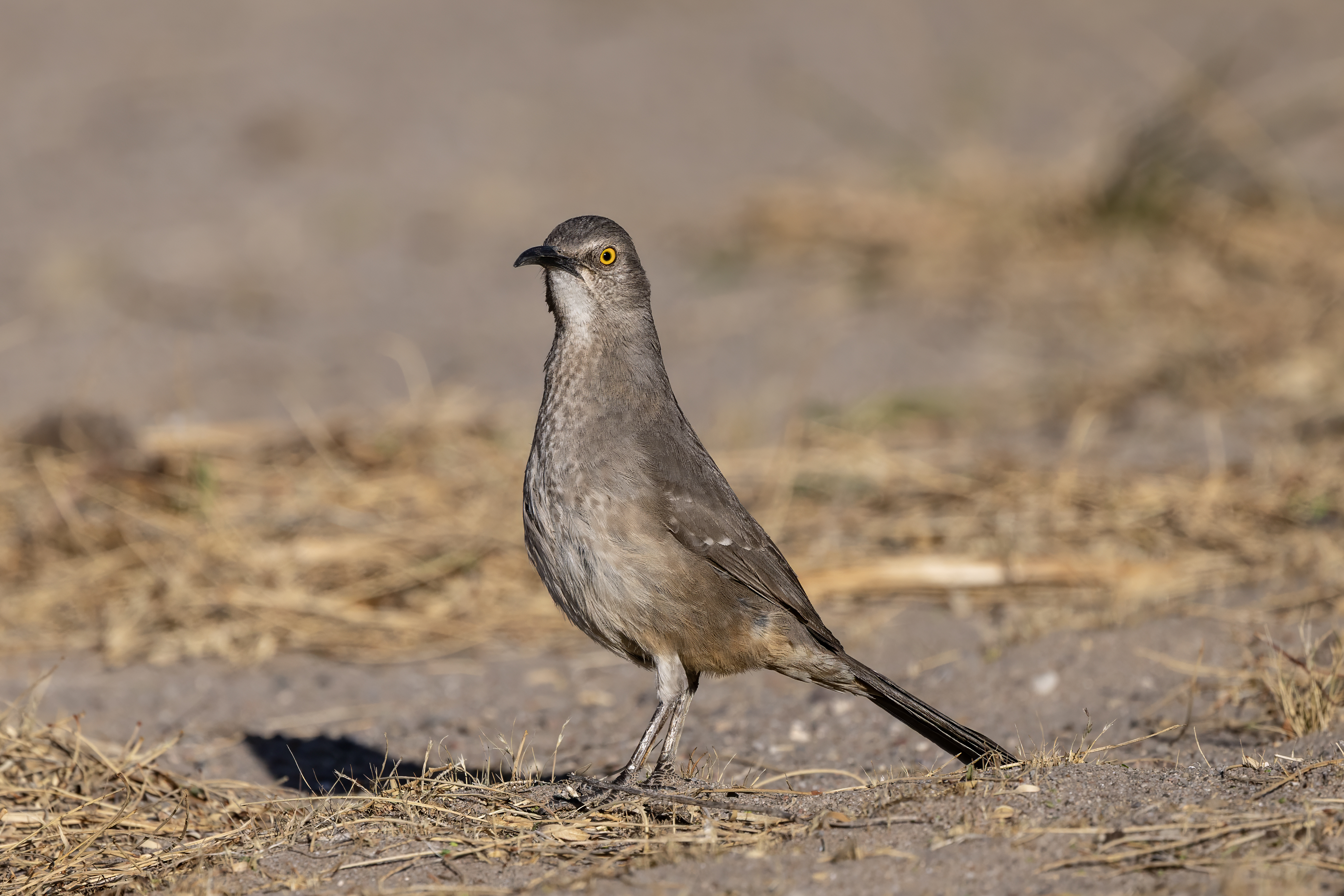
On the ground in Las Cruces, New Mexico

The curve-billed thrasher is immediately recognized as a thrasher by its long tail and short wings. It is also recognized for its sickle-shaped bill, almost as long as its head width and brownish black in color. The body is compact with a large head, short wings and long tail. However, the tail is short relative to other thrasher species. The chest is grayish brown with circular brown-gray spots. The eyes are generally orange, shading to golden in adulthood. Juveniles are lacking in pale tips, rectrices, abdominal feathers are unkempt and upper parts and chest are washed rufously.

Variations are markedly different with each subspecies. The eastern subspecies has more distinct spots on its chest, more white along the tips and rectrices and obvious wing bars. T.c. palmeri has less spotting on chest and tips and less obvious wing bars. Other examples include T.c. curvirostre possessing longer wings and a tail than T.c. oberholseri; T.c. insularum is paler with more grey than T.c. palmeri and has more visible spotting on its breast.

One study published in 2003 suggested that curve-billed speciation was due to climate, which could be explained by molt and feather wear. The same study suggested that the Sierra Madre Occidental acts as a barrier to initiate differentiation within the species.

Measurements:

- Length: 10.6–11.0 in (27–28 cm)
- Weight: 2.1–3.3 oz (60–94 g)
- Wingspan: 13.4–13.6 in (34–35 cm)

=== Voice and song ===
The most distinctive voice of the curve-billed is an abrupt and brash whit-wheet, which sounds akin to a person whistling to get one's attention. It is usually uttered from high perches. The songs are similar to that of the northern mockingbird but notes do not end as abruptly; its voice is regarded as more pleasant. The curve-billed can utter songs consecutively two or three times, the length spanning from 2 to 15 seconds. Some phrases are nasal and buzzy; its large vocabulary enables it to conjure successive songs that are usually different from one another.

As a mimid it is capable of mimicking several species, including scissor-tailed flycatcher, northern cardinal, pyrrhuloxia and, in one instance, a black-headed grosbeak.

=== Similar species ===
Because its coloration is similar to Bendire's thrasher, the two birds are easily mistaken for one another. The bill of the curve-billed is all black, while that of Bendire's is paler down to the lower mandible, showing a dark grey with a basal area that does not feature a stark contrast. The upper and lower mandibles of the curve-billed are curved, while the upper is curved and lower is essentially straight for the Bendires'. Although geographic variances for the curve-billed can make discerning breast patterns difficult, the curve-billed has a tendency to display larger and rounder spots overall on its breast, in contrast to the Bendires' smaller, more pronounced markings shaped like arrowheads. However, curve-billed thrashers can also present this feature. Bendires' typically have yellow eyes while curve-billed eyes are typically orange, but Bendires' can have variations that appear yellow-orange while some curve-billed eyes are red-orange, yellow-orange, or yellow. The curve-billed is heavier and is more likely to inhabit suburban regions; Bendires' are likely to avoid dense vegetation such as mesquite and prefers open grassland with scattered yucca or around hedgerows in agricultural areas. The song call of Bendire's is said to be more melodic and continuous with a chuck, while the curve-billed is known for its whit-wheet calls.

Some of the aforementioned differences, such as streaks on the breast, bill shape and eye color are even more prominent in juveniles of the two species.

== Habitat and distribution ==
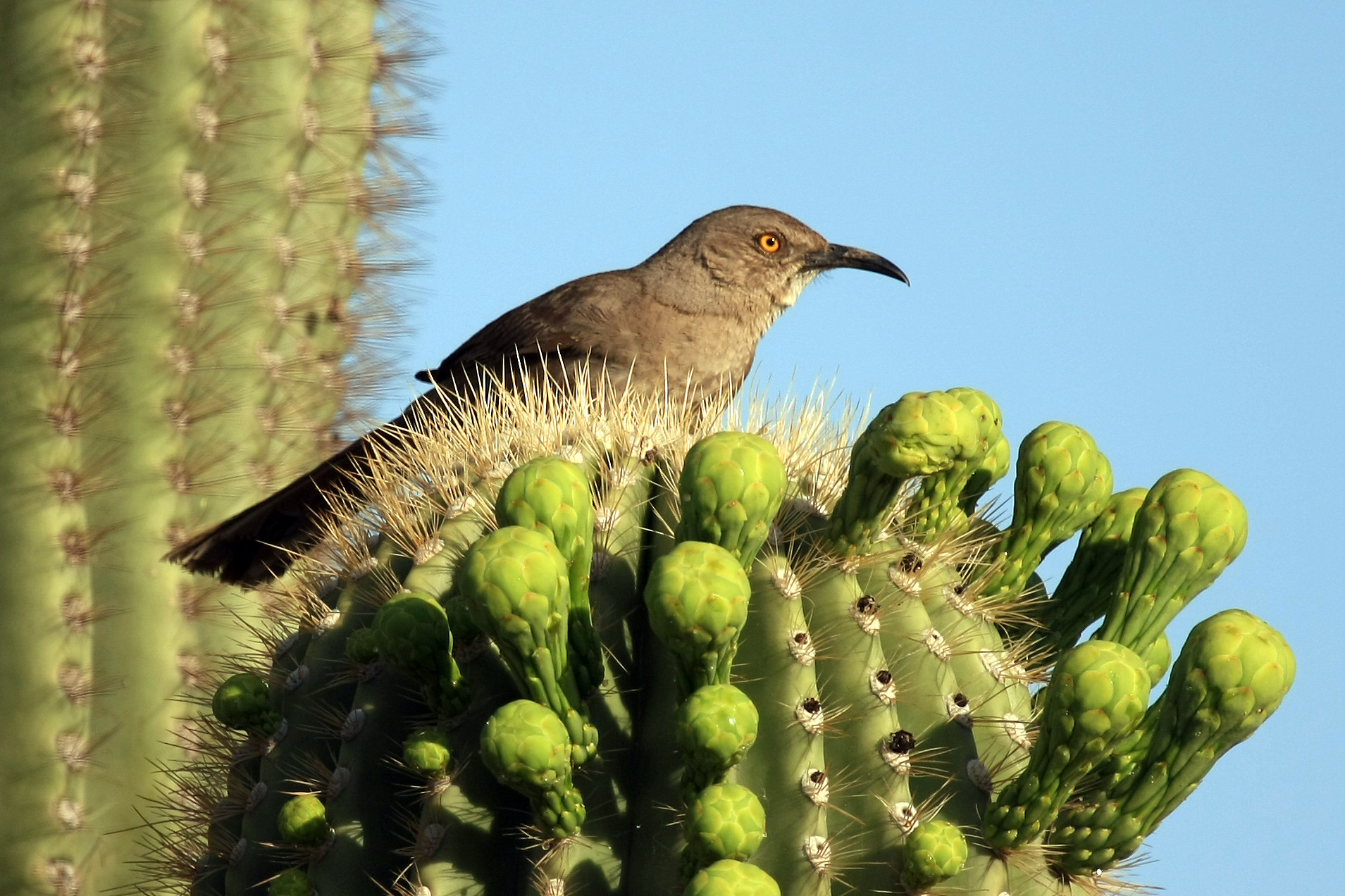
On a saguaro, whose nearly open blooms will provide important food

The curve-billed thrasher is commonly found throughout the southwestern United States from Arizona's Sonoran Desert across New Mexico to west Texas, southeastern Colorado and southwestern Kansas as well as most of Mexico from the Sonoran-Chihuahuan Deserts and south through the Mexican Plateau into Central Tamaulipas, inland to Oaxaca, and on the coast of Sonora to Nayarit. Vagrants have been found in bordering states of its range, as far north as North Dakota, Alberta and Manitoba and as far east as Florida. Palmeri types have been spotted in Florida, while curvirostre have been found in Iowa on several occasions. Other than previously noted exceptions, the curve-billed is essentially non-vagrant.

In comparison with other desert thrashers, the curve-billed is not as particular with habitats and can be found from sea-level up to 3,000 m (9,800 ft). It generally resides where cholla and saguaro cacti, ocotillo, mesquites, palo verde, and creosote bushes are prevalent. It can also be located along woodland edges, piñon, dry desert bushland and areas within its region where cacti are present. If there is an adequate amount of desert vegetation near human habitation, along with feeders, the curve-billed can adapt within these environments.

== Behavior and ecology ==
The curve-billed thrasher can generally be found running rapidly from cover to cover or flying near ground level from bush to bush. However, this bird is not shy about being in the open. It is generally a forager on ground level but can be very aggressive in routing out potential competitors for food at feeders, such as the Inca dove and round-tailed ground squirrel.

=== Mating ===
One recorded case of courtship behavior involving curve-billed thrashers describes two males attacking each other vigorously and resorting to purring and hissings sounds when neither bird appeared to relent. The two males then puffed up their chests and strutted up and down in front of the female. They continued to alternate between purr and hiss and fighting one another until one triumphed. The victor flew towards the female and both chirped melodically before copulation.

=== Breeding ===
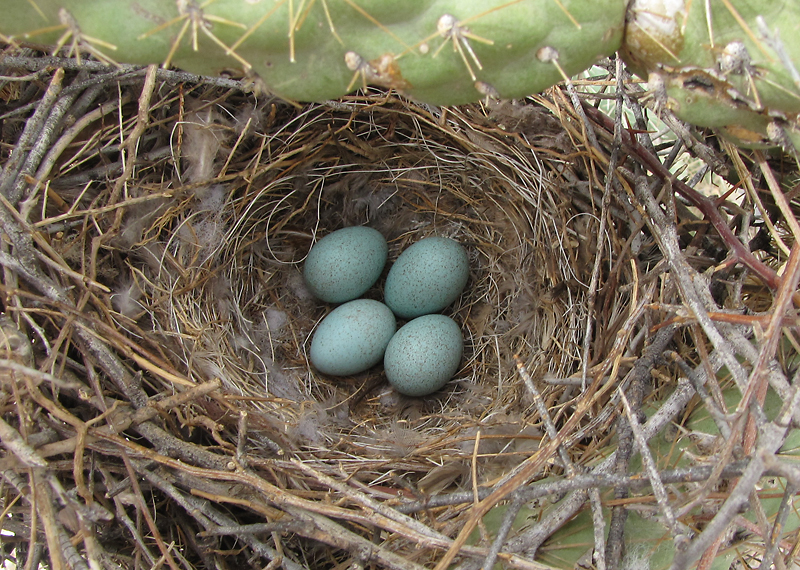
Nest with eggs in a cactus, showing off the open cup construction

The curve-billed breeding season begins in February and reaches an apex between March and May; however, new fledglings have been recorded as late as August. Dates vary within its range due to temperature and rainfall. Nests are generally built at conspicuous locations, the cholla being favored. Other potential nesting sites range from mesquite, prickly pear or yucca to the occasional oak and pine trees. The nest is generally a deep cup but can be flat with a depression for the eggs. The outer layer consists of thorny twigs while the inner layer includes smooth sticks, roots, coarse and fine grasses, rootlets or hair. In rare cases, they will nest in cavities, including human-made kestrel nest boxes.

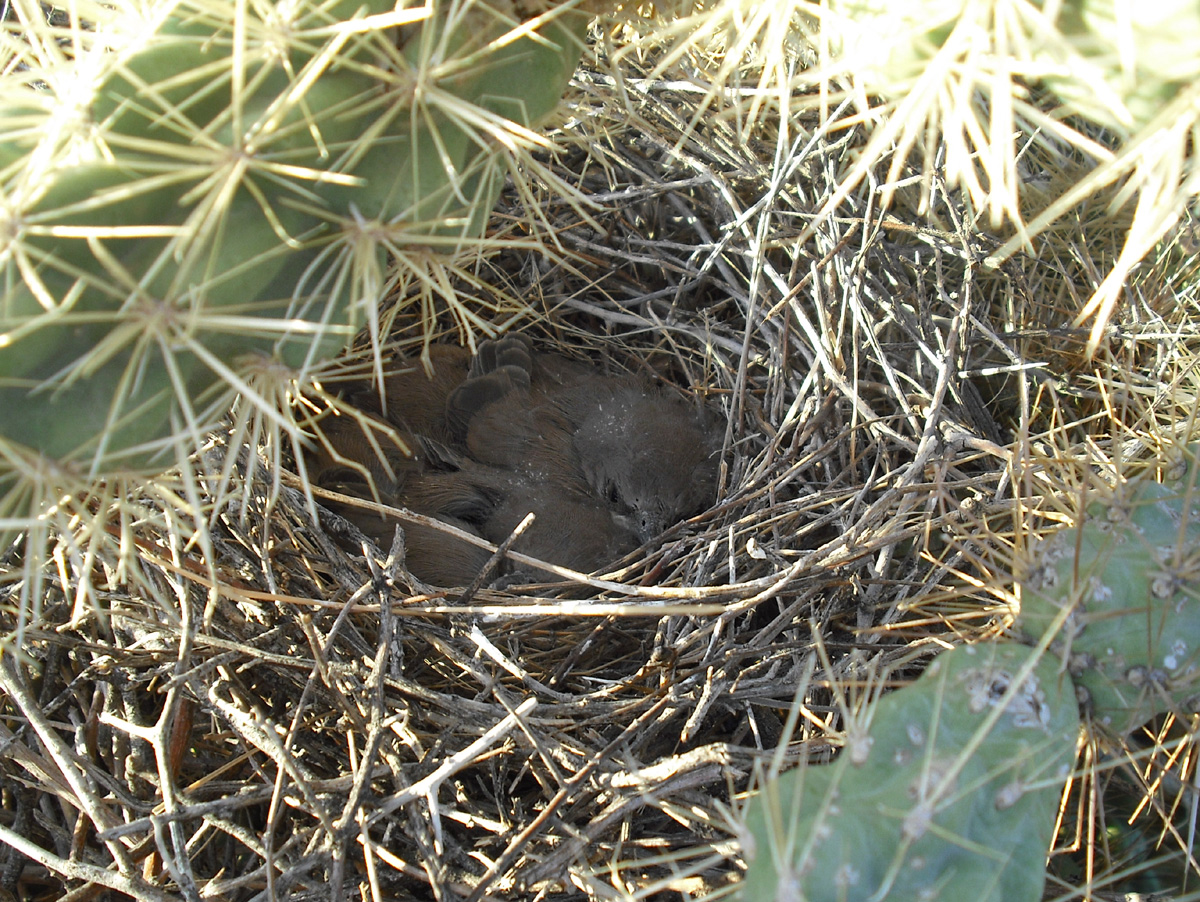
Curve-billed thrasher chicks in a nest constructed between branches of cholla cactus.

Both sexes build the nest; the building periods can be as brief as three days to as long as four weeks. Egg count differs by location; the number has been as low as two and as high as five. Egg color varies; they can appear bluish green to pale yellowish blue, spotted abundantly in reddish brown. Both sexes incubate but the female is mainly responsible as well as being the sole provider of brooding. Curve-billed parents defend their nests fervently against other species; snakes are the most frequent predators of eggs and nestlings. Curved-billed Thrashers are rarely victims of nest parasitism by cowbirds. In situations where food is scarce, parents feed older fledglings first. The fledging period ranges from 11 to 18 days.

=== Feeding ===
The curve-billed thrasher is an omnivore. Its diet includes invertebrates such as beetles, moths, butterflies, arachnids, and snails. It also eats vegetable matter, and fruits from cacti, prickly pear, hackberries, and anacua, among other plants. The curve-billed has also been spotted eating dog food, and will feed it to their chicks. They are ground feeders, and not well adapting to climbing on branches. Thrashers will take surface prey, but will also dig holes more than 2 inches (5.1 cm) deep to search for food. Curve-billeds will also sip nectar from saguaro blossoms and eat insects trapped within, serving as pollinators in the process. They also have great love for the resulting saguaro fruits, which is an important source of water in dry months.^{:168-187}

=== Threats ===
Predators, which mainly focus on young birds, include snakes, coyotes, and roadrunners. This may account for very low brood success in the species, as only 20% of nests are successful in a year.^{:183-185}

Curve-billed thrashers share a very similar range to the cactus wren, as well as a favorite species to nest in: the jumping cholla. Because of this, interspecific conflict is frequent. Fights over food are rare, but fights to protect fledglings are heated. They will vigorously work to destroy each other's nests, although typically only roosting nests, not breeding nests, are destroyed. Despite this, nests of curve-billeds and cactus wrens may still be concurrently and successfully raised even feet away from each other. Anderson & Anderson noted a minimum nest distance of a highly unusual 15 centimetres (neither nest was destroyed by the either throughout the entire season), although average interspecies nest distances were well over thirty metres. Nest destruction is almost always unsuccessful, and less intense, during breeding times, as both species adamantly defend their own nests. Once breeding season wanes, and fledglings emerge, competition becomes more fierce.^{:168-187}

== Status ==
Although its populations is declining, the curve-billed thrasher is rated as a species of least concern by the International Union for Conservation of Nature.
