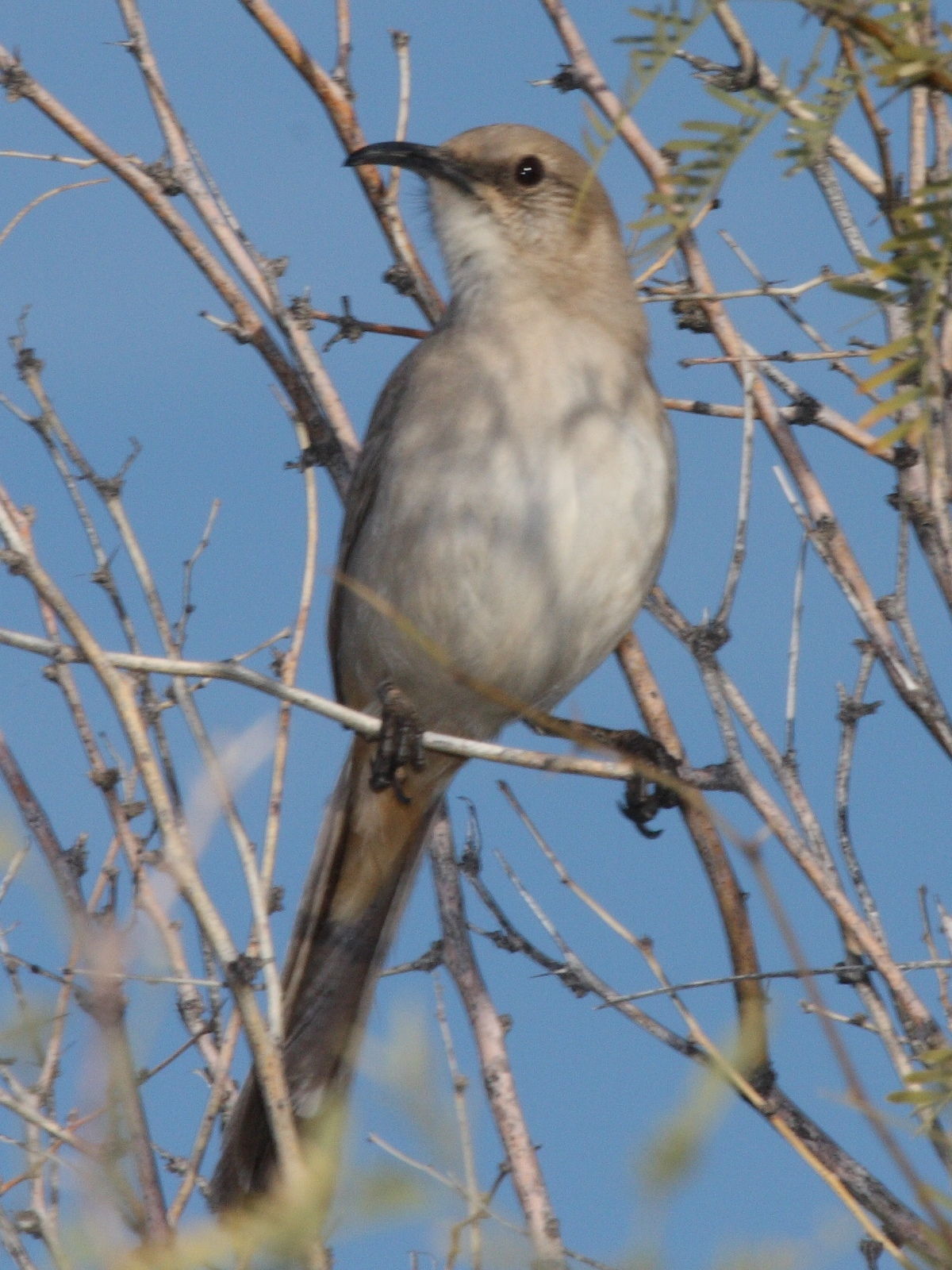

Conservation status
- Least Concern (IUCN 3.1)

Scientific classification
- Kingdom: Animalia
- Phylum: Chordata
- Class: Aves
- Order: Passeriformes
- Family: Mimidae
- Genus: Toxostoma
- Species: T. lecontei

Binomial name
- Toxostoma lecontei Lawrence, 1851
- LeConte's thrasher range

= LeConte's thrasher =

Species of bird

LeConte's thrasher (Toxostoma lecontei) is a pale bird found in the southwestern United States and northwestern Mexico. It prefers to live in deserts with very little vegetation, where it blends in with the sandy soils. LeConte's thrashers are nonmigratory birds that reside in the same territory annually. Although the species has been decreasing in certain areas of its range, in particular California, it still is abundant enough to not be considered for vulnerable status.

These birds are terrestrial and only fly occasionally. Both sexes are heavily involved in the nest building, incubating, and brooding process, though each alternates with primary responsibility of the tasks. LeConte's thrashers frequently compete with species such as the northern mockingbird, loggerhead shrike and greater roadrunner, as well as being potential prey for the latter.

== Taxonomy ==
LeConte's thrasher is named after Dr. John Lawrence LeConte, an entomologist who eventually became president of the American Association for the Advancement of Science. There are two subspecies:

T.l. lecontei (Lawrence, 1851) – range is from southwestern United States (south central and eastern California, southwest Utah, and south central Arizona) to northwestern Mexico (north east Baja California and northwest Sonora).

T.l. arenicola (Anthony, 1897) Rosalia thrasher; west coast of Baja California.

T.l. arenicola has been proposed by the American Ornithologists Union as separate species, and treated as a separate species by other authors. and a name of Vizcaino thrasher if it becomes official. T.l. arenicola still is treated as a subspecies of lecontei by some authors, however. A proposed race T.c. macmillanorum only exhibits minor differences in plumage from T.l. lecontei (such as a darker crown and lighter flanks), but is not justified by biochemical or morphological grounds. One study suggested that the phylogeographic structure of the LeConte's is consistent with both its geographic distribution and genetics, with the Vizcaíno Desert in Baja California acting as a barrier initiating allopatric speciation.

The two closest living relatives of LeConte's thrasher, the California thrasher and the crissal thrasher, form as the lecontei group. The similarities with these three species contrasted with other Toxostoma thrashers, in particular the sickle-shaped bill, longer legs and smaller wings indicated its adaption to a preference to running and digging for food.

== Description ==
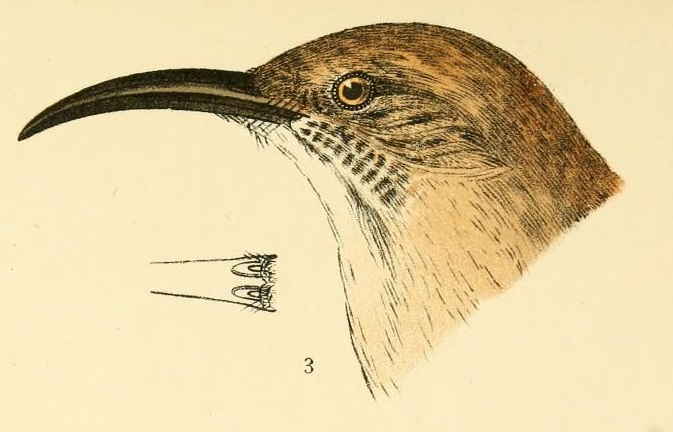
Leconte's thrasher illustration from Baird, 1905

LeConte's thrasher weighs from 55 to 75 g (1.9 to 2.6 oz) and are 24.5–29 cm (9.6–11.4 in), and there is no sexual dimorphism within the species. Their wings are typical of birds that are sedentary, as they are short and rounded. There are noted differences among the subspecies. The crown, back, shoulders, and rump of T.c. lecontei possess a sandy pale-gray color. The primaries and secondaries are grayish brown. The rectrices are of a darker gray brown that contrasts with the plumage. Lores and ear-coverts are a mottled gray brown. The throat is an off-whitish color of a darker stripe. The chest and belly is puffy gray, and the vent and uppertail coverts are of a warmer tint in contrast to the palish chest and belly. The underwing is both gray and buff, with a brown-chestnut iris, a black-sickle shaped bill, and legs that are nearly black. T.l. arenicola has a darker chest and underparts and a shorter tail. In its juvenile stages, the thrasher is darker brown, and its feathers looser and fluffy in appearance, especially on the vent.

== Range and habitat ==
This bird ranges from California as far west as the San Joaquin Valley through southern Nevada and southwestern Utah and central and southern Arizona, and is a resident species throughout its range. It resides in some of the harshest climates in its region, including the Sonoran Desert and the San Joaquin Valley, and where annual rainfall only averages 4 to 20 cm. The typical desert habitat consists of dunes, alluvial fans, and flat to gently rolling hills with shallow washes with sparse vegetation. The vegetation that it may utilize includes low vegetation such as saltbush, creosote, cholla cacti, and Mojave yucca. The range of altitude spans as low as 80 m below sea level (in Death Valley) to as high as 1,600 m, although 500 m above sea level is the average. It does not generally coexist with other thrashers due to its habitat, but does overlap breeding ranges and general habitat with the California thrasher in the higher desert regions of its range.

The thrasher has had its population decline in certain regions of its range, notably the Coachella, Imperial and the San Joaquin Valley regions. Major reasons for its decline include urbanization, cultivation of land for livestock, oil and gas development, and fire with the increase of invasive species of grasses. Off-road vehicle use is a minor factor, while military operations conducted in the region have been considered, but not properly researched. However, there are apparent areas of suitable acreage for the thrasher that have not been utilized, and its population in undisturbed regions appear to be more stable. Although the thrasher has relatively small numbers on a worldwide scale for a passerine, and has been listed as a species of concern in the state of California, its large range overall justifies its status as least concern.

== Behavior ==
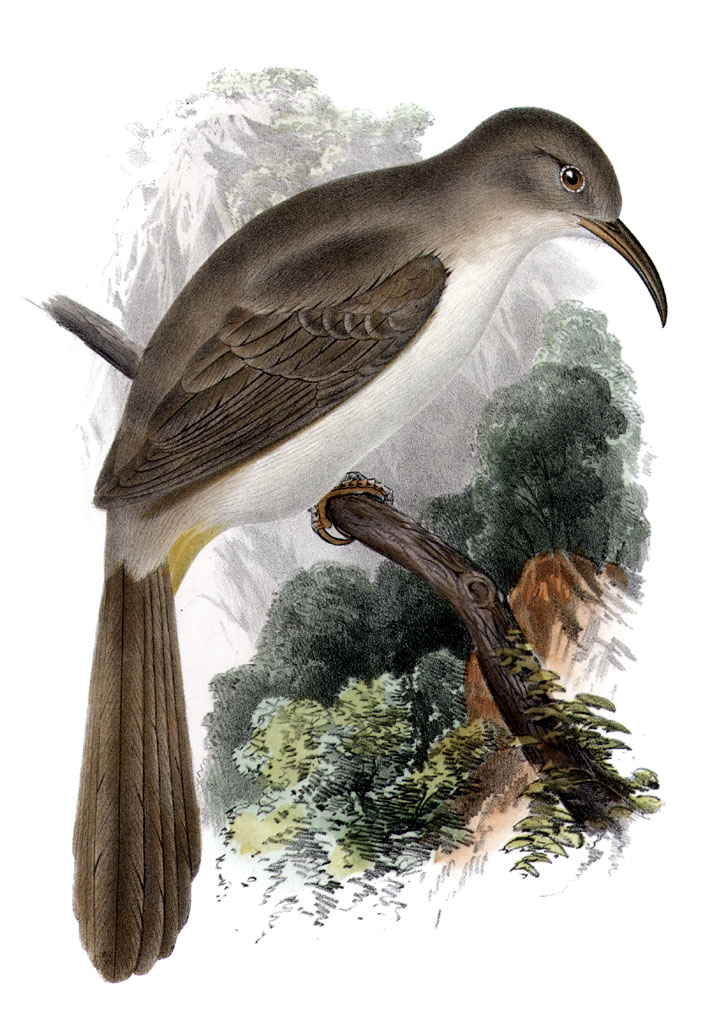
Toxostoma lecontei

This thrasher is a highly terrestrial bird, and is only seen flying when nest building or feeding its young. It runs at a surprisingly fast pace, even at speeds to outpace a trotting horse. When it does run, its tail is generally held upward, exposing its buffy crissum. LeConte's thrasher is a ground forager, and will dig small pits in leaf litter or soil to find its prey. It is a monogamous species, and generally seen in pairs, and juveniles may form small parties from two to eight birds.

=== Song ===
The song is a large, prolonged outpouring of warbled phrases that can be repeated two or several times and can be heard from considerable distances, which is typical of the genus Toxostoma. The song starts softly, then increases in volume, and has a more measured delivery than that of the crissal thrasher. The song bouts have been compared to curve-billed thrashers, but are higher pitched and marked by clear intervals. The song is generally uttered from an exposed perch, and is generally heard either in the morning or in the evening, though it has been heard at night. Females also sing on occasion, in a manner similar to juvenile male LeConte's. Calls include a short whistle note suuuweeee, hew-eep or pooh-ip, along with the double-noted whistling distress call.

=== Diet ===
The diet is omnivorous, and includes arthropods such as beetles, scorpions, spiders, grasshoppers, butterflies, moth larvae, and small lizards and snakes. Eggs are also part of its diet, including those of its own species. Plant consumption includes seeds and berries. The LeConte's conserve water as an adaptation to their arid habitat and obtain what they need from their food. While they generally do not have to drink, there has been one recorded instance of such an event.

=== Breeding ===
The singing season typically begins in mid-autumn and peaks around late December and early January, when nest building begins. The nests are generally of a bulky build, with outer layer of twigs, a middle layer of twigs, grasses, and rootlets, and an inner layer of insulating materials such as fuzzy plant seeds, leaves or flowers. Feathers and artificial material have been used as well, but these instances are rare. Dense and thorny shrubs such as the saltbush are preferred sites, although artificial sites such as abandoned vehicles and heights as high as 2.4 m with smoke trees have been used when the general distance of nests off the ground are usually only half as low. Both sexes take part in nest building, although the participation of the male varies. Nest fidelity is generally observed with the species until one of the mates die. The territories of the nesting pairs may be adjacent to one another due to food sources, although conflicts are rarely had.

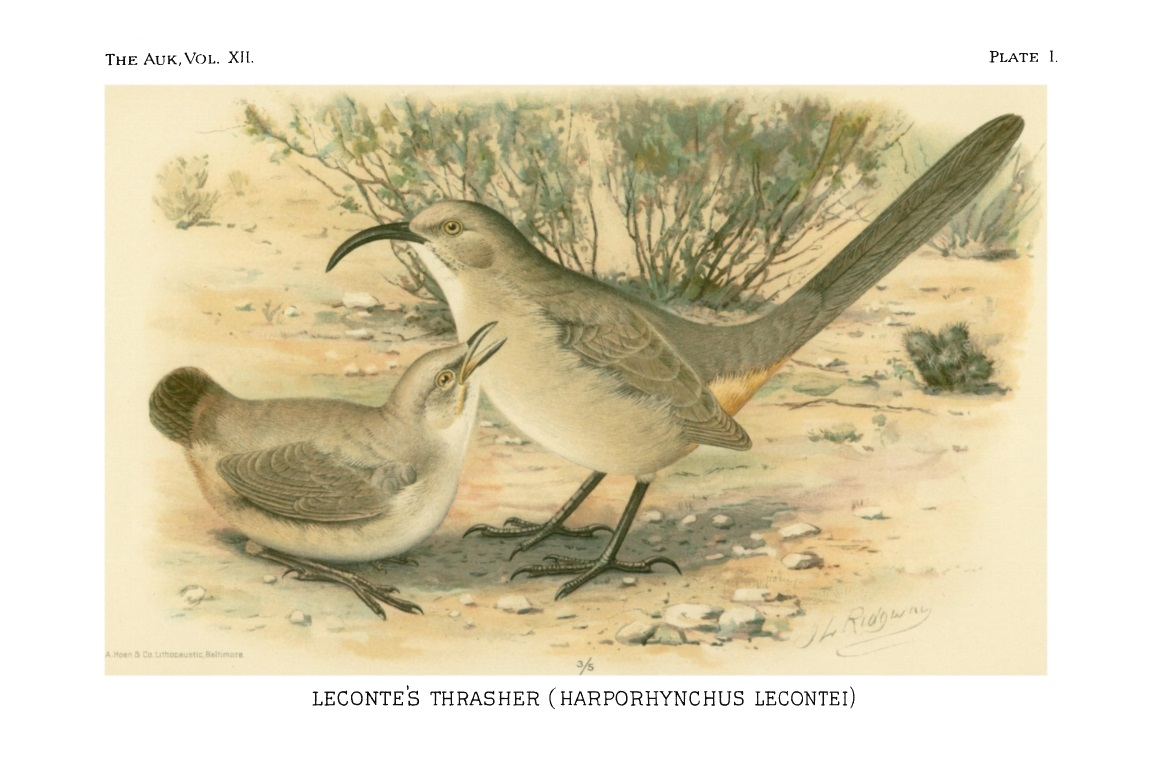
LeConte's thrasher illustration from Merriam, 1895

The egg dates generally range from February to the end of May in California, and in the Sonoran region from December to April, though dates have been listed as early as late January and as late as the latter part of June. The clutch size ranges from 2 to 5 eggs, but the number is generally 3–4. The eggs are large-sized and bluish green that may either contain various degrees of brown spotting or no markings. The eggs are generally laid once a day and incubation begins once the last egg is laid, and lasts from 14 to 20 days. The male generally provides the food for the female, as well as food for the young during the brooding stages. The female is more likely to incubate at night, however. If the nest is destroyed or preyed upon, a new one is generally built, as they can have up to three broods during the reproductive season.

The young are fed by both parents during the fledgling period, which can span from 12 to 20 days, and can be continued to be fed after for 15 to 18 days afterward, especially if the female is brooding the next clutch. At around 30 days old, the fledglings disperse, and may form small groups.

== Predators and competitors ==
These birds defend their territory year-round, but males are generally less territorial in the summer months during molting and the fledgling dispersals. Males may give a visual display to intruding males by employing a head down position, showing off their crissum (the undertail coverts surrounding the cloaca) while simultaneously disappearing into a bush head first in a slow motion. Their territories are most actively defended from early December to early February. Potential competitors for food and nesting sites include the northern mockingbird, sage thrasher, loggerhead shrike, house finch, black-throated sparrow, cactus wren, and the greater roadrunner. They may share the same nesting shrub or tree with their competitors, such as the loggerhead shrike.

They are rarely victims of cowbird parasitism. LeConte's thrasher has been recorded being victimized by the bronzed cowbird in a least one instance, but not by the brown-headed cowbird. However, when 11 brown-headed cowbird eggs were placed in the thrasher's nest in an experiment, they were accepted.

Some of the predators of the eggs, young, and adults of this species include birds of prey, greater roadrunners, antelope squirrels, domestic cats, dogs, coyotes, and various snake species.
