= David Ross (American football) =

American football coach, athletics administrator (born 1959)

Biographical details
- Born: November 18, 1959 (age 66); Independence, Missouri, U.S.

Playing career
- 1978–1981: Central Methodist
- Positions: Quarterback, defensive back

Coaching career (HC unless noted)
- 1982–1983: NE Oklahoma A&M (DL)
- 1983–1985: Oklahoma State (GA)
- 1986–1987: Central Methodist (AHC/DC)
- 1988–1991: William Chrisman HS (MO)
- 1991–1994: Blue Springs South HS (MO)
- 1995–1999: Kemper
- 2001–2005: Bacone
- 2006–2007: Illinois State (CB)
- 2008: Illinois State (DC/CB)
- 2009–2010: UTSA (assistant)

Administrative career (AD unless noted)
- 2001–2006: Bacone

Head coaching record
- Overall: 27–26 (college); 33–20 (junior college)

David Ross (born November 18, 1959) is an American former football coach and athletics administrator. He served as the head football coach at Bacone College in Muskogee, Oklahoma from 2001 to 2005, compiling a record of 27–26. He was the head football coach at Kemper Military School in Boonville, Missouri from 1995 to 1999.

== Coaching career ==
Ross began his coaching career at Northeastern Oklahoma A&M Junior College in Miami, Oklahoma in 1982 after graduating from Central Methodist College in Fayette, Missouri. Ross was the hired, in 1984, by Jimmy Johnson at Oklahoma State University. He left Oklahoma State in 1986 to become the assistant head coach and defensive coordinator at his college alma mater, Central Methodist. In 1988, he was hired to be the head football coach at his high school alma mater, William Chrisman High School, and inherited a 30-game losing streak. In 1992, Ross was hired as the first head football coach at Blue Springs South High School in Blue Springs, Missouri. He coached his team at Blue Springs South to 11–1 record in its third year, losing in the state quarterfinals.

In 1995, Ross was hired as the head football coach at Kemper Military Junior College in Boonville, Missouri. Kemper dropped its football program after the 1999 season.

In February 2000, Ross was appointed as the head football coach at Bacone College in Muskogee, Oklahoma. Bacone had not fielded a football team since 1956 before returning to play in 2001. Ross was served as Bacone's athletic director until January 2006, when he was promoted to special assistant to the president for athletic development. He was succeeded as head football coach by Joseph Thrasher.

Ross departed Bacone in 2006 to be an assistant at Illinois State University, coaching cornerbacks for all three years while later serving as defensive coordinator. He was later an assistant coach for the UTSA Roadrunners.

== Head coaching record ==
=== College ===
Year	Team	Overall	Conference	Standing
Bacone Warriors (NAIA independent) (2001)
2001	Bacone	5–5		
Bacone Warriors (Central States Football League) (2002–2005)
2002	Bacone	6–5	3–1	2nd
2003	Bacone	5–7	3–2	T–2nd
2004	Bacone	7–3	5–1	2nd
2005	Bacone	4–6	2–4	5th
Bacone:		27–26	13–8	
Total:		27–26		
