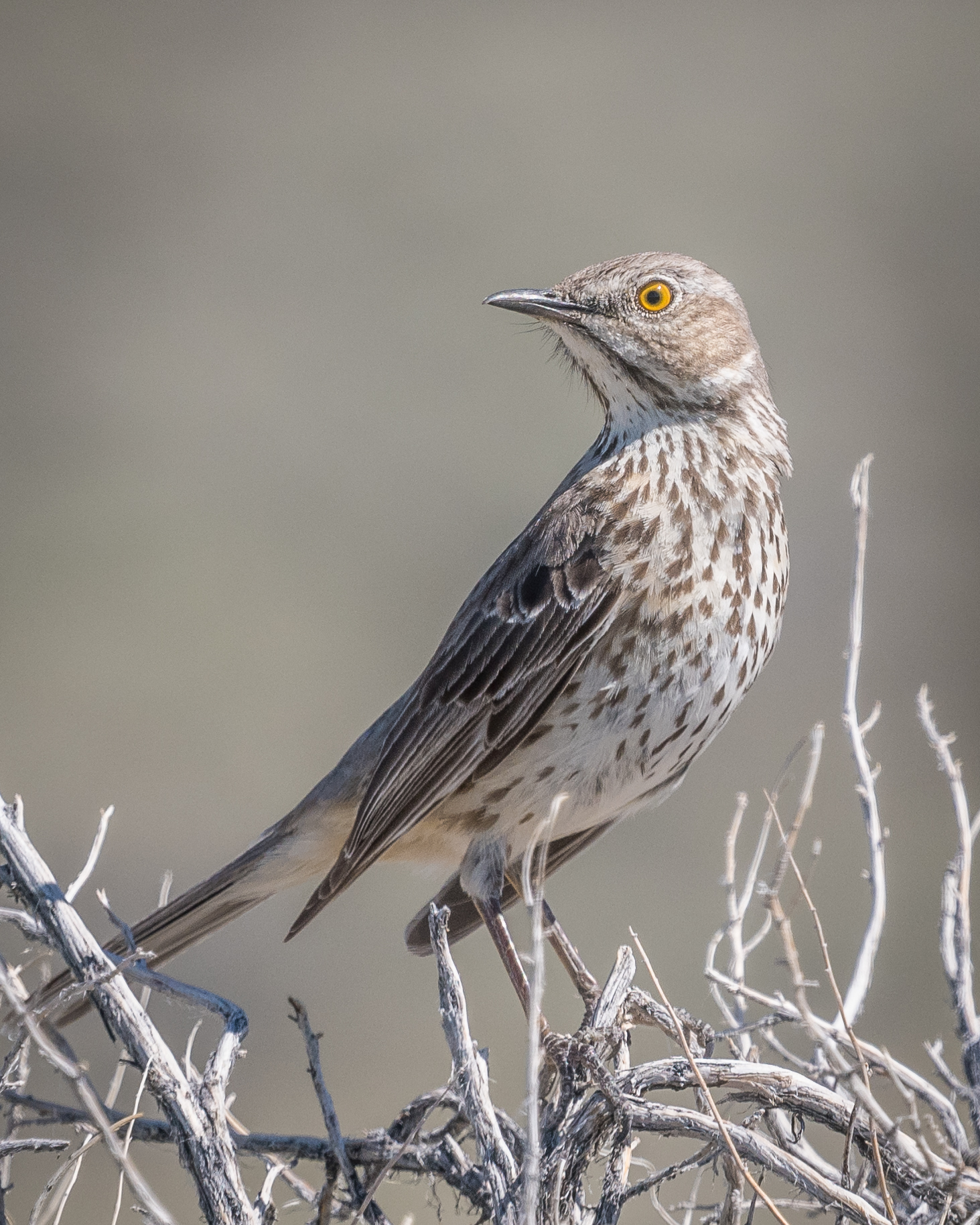
- Mono Lake, California, U.S.

Conservation status
- Least Concern (IUCN 3.1)

- Endangered (COSEWIC)

Scientific classification
- Kingdom: Animalia
- Phylum: Chordata
- Class: Aves
- Order: Passeriformes
- Family: Mimidae
- Genus: Oreoscoptes; Baird, 1858
- Species: O. montanus

Binomial name
- Oreoscoptes montanus (Townsend, 1837)
- Breeding range Migration Nonbreeding

= Sage thrasher =

Species of bird

The sage thrasher (Oreoscoptes montanus) is a medium-sized passerine bird in the family Mimidae. It is the only species in the genus Oreoscoptes and the smallest of the thrashers. It is found in the regions of western North America, breeding from the Great Basin to southern British Columbia, and migrates south to southern United States and northern Mexico for winter. Sage thrashers are commonly found in shrubsteppe habitat and are strongly associated with sagebrush (Artemisia spp.) for which it relies on for nesting.

== Description ==
The sage thrasher is a medium-sized passerine, measuring 20.0-23.0 cm in length and weighing 39.6-50.3g. Its eyes are distinctive ranging from lemon-yellow to amber coloration. Juveniles have paler upperparts and lightly streaked underparts compare to the adults. Adults display brownish-gray upperparts and white underparts marked with dark streaks. Plumage remains relatively similar throughout the year. Sage thrasher can be distinguished from other thrashers by its shorter and less curved bill, shorter tail and smaller size.

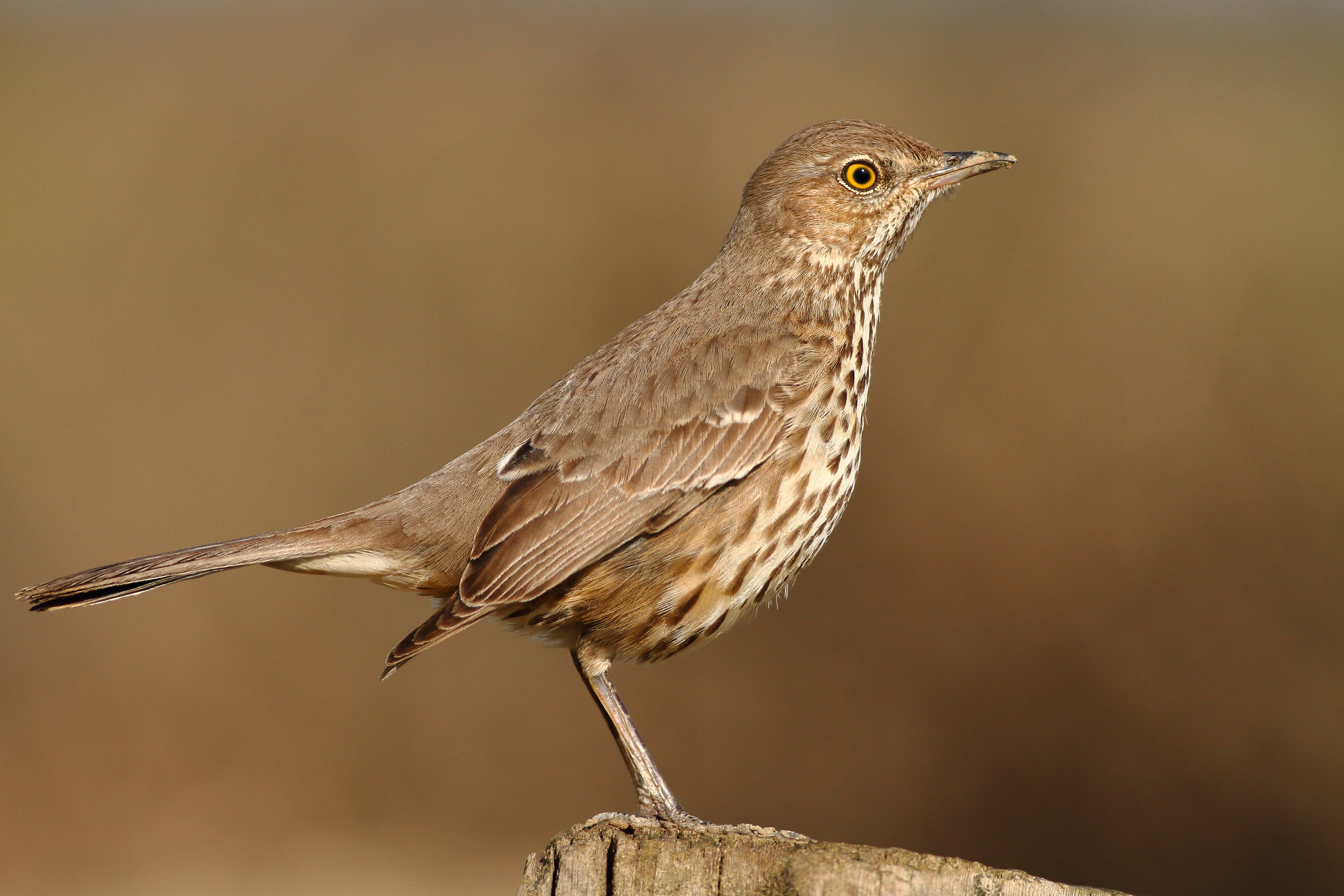
Sage Thrasher wintering in Woodland, California. February 2017.

== Taxonomy ==
The species was first described by the ornithologist John Kirk Townsend in 1837 and was given the name of "mountain mockingbird", but was later changed to its current name "sage thrasher" for looking more similar to thrasher than mockingbirds and based on their habitat. Just like the sage thrasher, "sage" has been used to name other birds species that are strongly associated with sagebrush such as Greater sage-grouse and the Sagebrush sparrow. The genus name Oreoscoptes comes from the Greek oreos, "mountain", and skōptō, "mocker". Montanus in Latin means "from the mountains".

The species is more closely related to the genus Mimus, which includes the typical mockingbirds, than to Toxostoma, the genus that includes the typical thrashers. As a results, thrashers are consider a phenetic assemblage, a group classified based on morphological similarities rather than by shared ancestry, as members of the group are paraphyletic. The genus Oreoscoptes is monotypic, containing only the sage thrasher.

== Habitat and Distribution ==
The sage thrasher breeds in shrubsteppe habitats dominated by big sagebrush (Artemisia tridentata) across the western United States and southern Canada. Sagebrush are essential for nesting and provides protection from the heat and from predators. The abundance of sage thrasher is positively correlated with the amount of sagebrush cover in an area as well as with woody vegetation and bare ground, and negatively with grass cover.

The northern limit of the sage thrasher for breeding extends into south-central British Columbia, Canada, in Similkameen and Okanagan valleys. In the United States, the species breeds from central Washington southward through eastern Oregon and the northerneastern part of California. Its range extaends eastward across Nevada, Utah, western Colorado, southern Idaho, Wyoming, southern Montana, and into northern Arizona and New Mexico. During winter, the sage thrasher occurs from souther from southern Nevada through central and southern Arizona, central and southern New Mexico, and west-central Texas. In Mexico, its wintering range includes northern Baja California, northwestern and central Sonora, northern Chihauahua, and Nuevo León, extending south to south to Durango. Sage thrasher are short-distance migrant and migrate towards their breeding range in early spring and leave for their wintering range in early fall.

== Behaviour and ecology ==
=== Vocalization ===
Sage thrashers sing to attract mates and establish territories. During migration to their breeding grounds, silent individuals travel ahead of occupied territories by others until they reach an unoccupied one, where they begin to sing they are established. Singing is most frequent during territory establishment and pair formation, and stop when nest building starts. In a study in southwestern Idaho, the average song duration of four males was three minutes and the longest song lasting 22 minutes. Singing typically occurs when perch on top of surrounding vegetation.

The song consist of long sequences of soft syllables describes as being moderately musical and lacking harsh notes. Adults also produce "chuck" notes as an alarm call in response to threats. Like some of its relatives, the sage thrasher is capable of vocal mimicry and may include imitations of other bird species in its song such as the Western Meadowlark, Brewer's Sparrow and Horned Lark.

=== Breeding ===
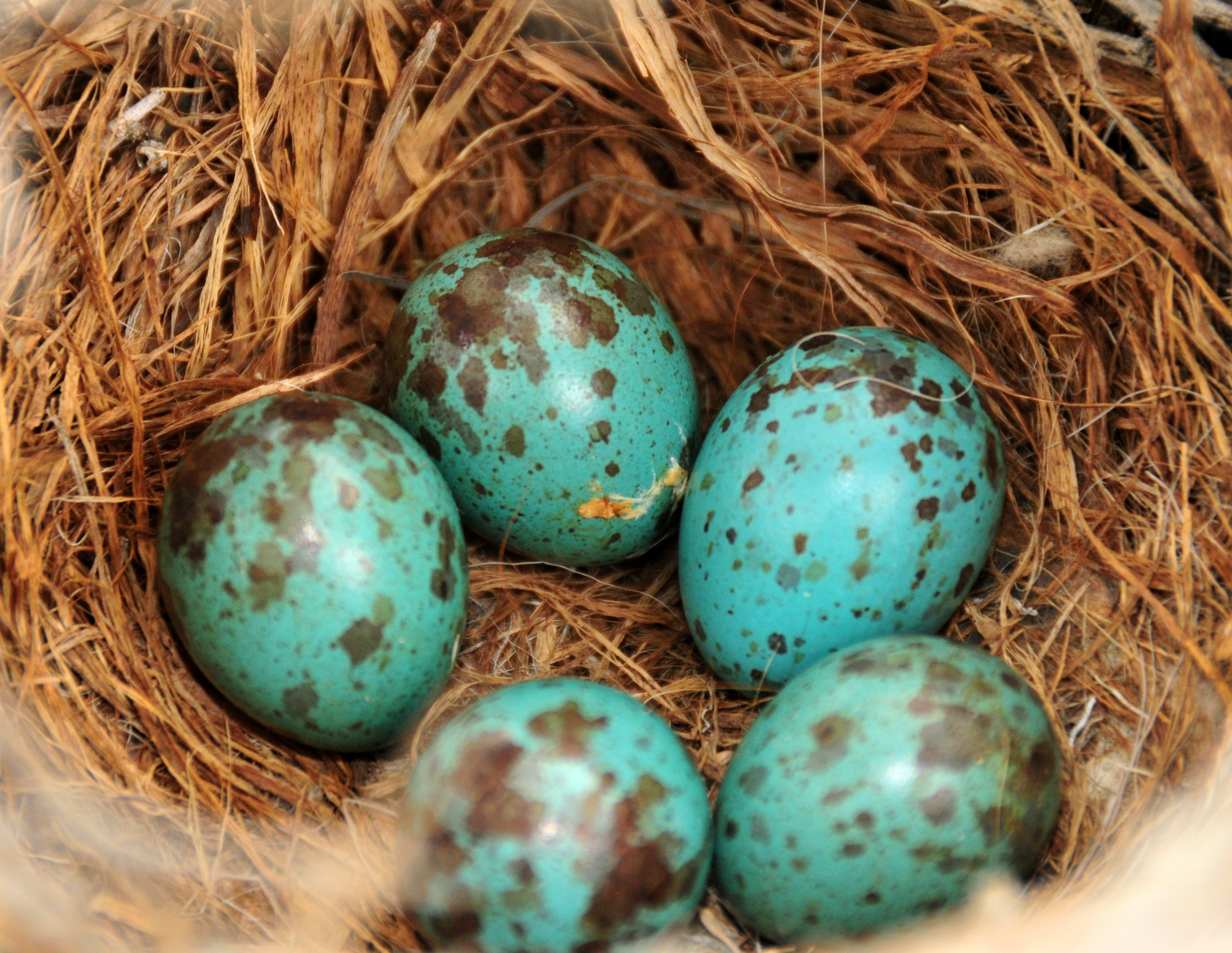
Sage Thrasher nest with a clutch of five eggs in Seedaskadee National Wildlife Refuge

The sage thrasher typically nest in big sagebrush (Artemisia tridentata) and three-tip sagebrush (A. tripartita), although it may be able to use other type of shrub species. Nests are either build in the sagebrush or under it where the nest is covered by the shrub. Their breeding habitat is characterized by an extreme temperature fluctuation between day and night, and several studies suggest that sage thrashers construct their nests to buffer against temperature variations. They often place their nest in the densest parts of the vegetation, sometimes beneath old nest for additional shading, and at optimal height to take advantage of cooler air near the ground and wind that helps dissipate heat. This placement may also aid to conceal nest from aerial predators. Nests are frequently oriented towards the east rather than the west which allows to provide solar heat to the nest in the morning and protect it from direct exposure during the middle of the day where the sun is the most intense.

The nest is cup-shaped, about 10 cm in height and 18–20 cm in diameter and is built with parts of sagebrush such as twigs, bark strips, rootlets and can also contains cowhairs and feathers. The clutch usually contains four to five eggs, each averaging 25 mm in length and 4.3g in mass. Eggs are blue-green color with reddish or dark spots concentrated at the bottom of the egg. Both sexes contribute in the incubation process. During the breeding season, the sage thrasher defend their territory through song, undulating flight displays, and chase flight by pursuing intruders.

==== Brood parasitism ====
Like some of its relatives in the Mimidae family, suc as the gray catbird, the brown thrasher and the Crissal thrasher, evidence suggests thay the sage thrasher can recognize and reject eggs of brood-parasitic brown-headed cowbirds (Molothrus ater). Experiments have shown that sage thrashers will eject eggs painted like cowbird eggs, but may accepted similar looking painted eggs to their own that differs in size. Characteristics that supports the species ability to reject cowbird eggs include visual distinctiveness between sage thrasher and cowbird eggs, the species practice of nest sanitation, large and accessible nests that attracts parasitism, and has a large enough bill to eject eggs.

=== Diet ===
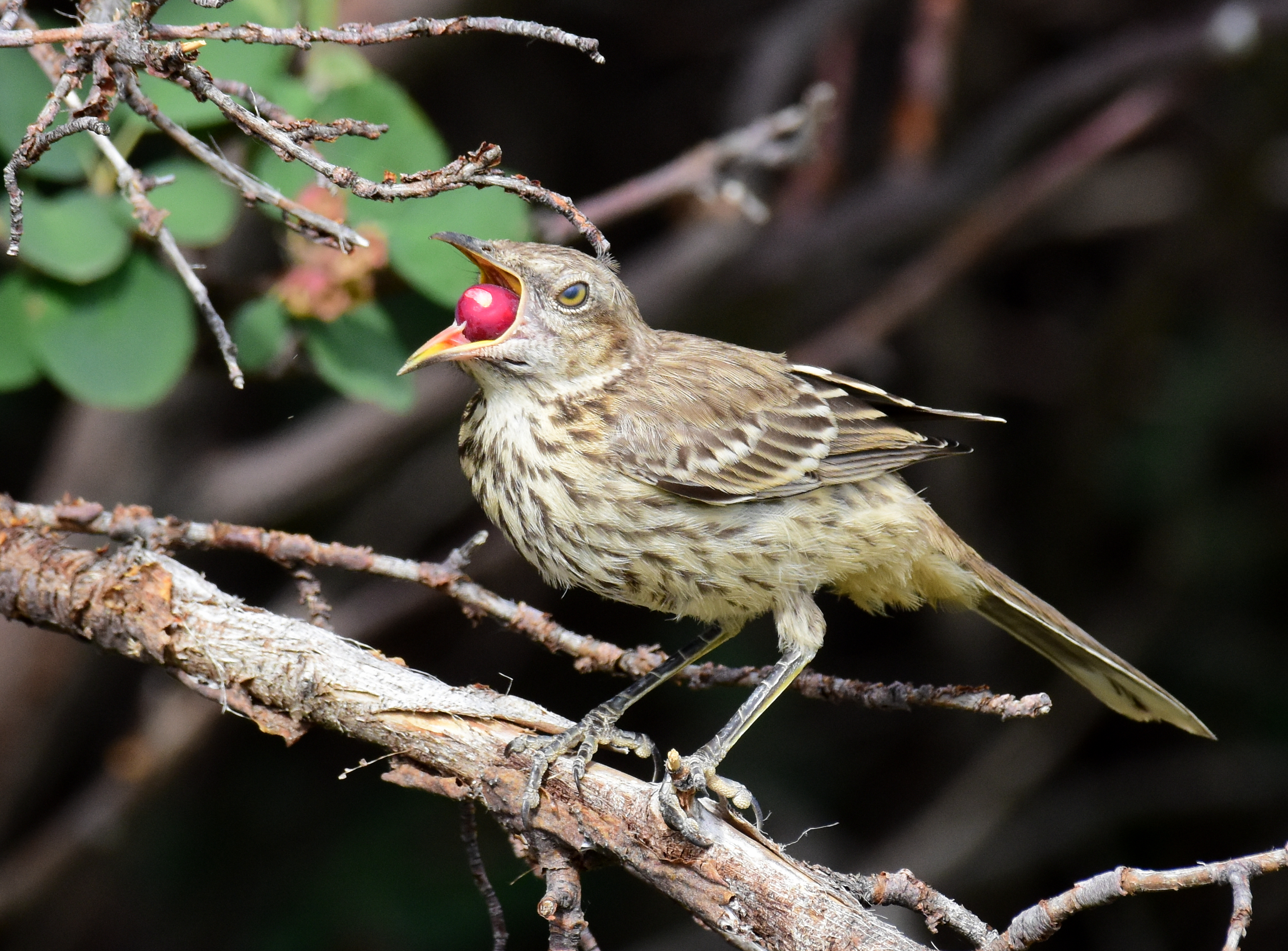
Sage thrasher at Seedskadee National Wildlife Refuge eating a berry

Sage thrashers primarily forage on the ground feeding, feeding mainly on terrestrial insects. They are opportunistic feeders, and their diet reflects the prey availability in their environment. Food items include ants, ground beetles, true bugs, grasshoppers, and crickets. The species can help control populations of Mormon crickets as their swarms can damage rangelands and crops. They have even been observed not only feeding on adult crickets, but also digging in the soil to eat their egg beds. Sage thrashers can also eat berries and seeds.

== Threats ==
As a sagebrush obligate, the sage thrasher depends on sagebrush for nesting and is therefore vulnerable to habitat loss. The species is affected by fragmented shrubsteppe habitats caused by wildfire and human disturbance. Shrubsteppe habitats converted into urban development or agricultural land have historically caused local extirpation of the species in some of its range. Annual grass cover such as cheatgrass (Bromus tectorum) in shrubsteppe seems to also be negatively associated with occurrence of sage thrasher for nesting.

Nest predators includes rodents such as the deer mouse (Peromyscus maniculatus) and ground squirrels, medium-sized mammals like the raccoon (Procyon lotor) and the American badger (Taxidea taxus), and predatory birds like the American kestrel (Falco sparverius), the short-eared-owl (Asio flammeus) and the loggerhead shrike (Lanius ludovicianus). The presence of loggerhead shrikes appears to reduce the density of nesting passerines, including the sage thrasher, in sagebrush habitat over time. In a documented case, a loggerhead shrike reused a sage thrasher nest within the same breeding season after it got predated by an unknown predator.

== Conservation ==
The species in Canada has been classified as an Endangered species by COSEWIC, found in southern British Columbia and Alberta. Reasons for designation are that it is very small population of an estimated 7 to 36 adults, low level of immigration from Washington and Montana, and reduction of sage-brush habitat due to anthropogenic development and fires.

In Washington, the Washington Department of Fish & Wildlife (WDFW) consider the sage thrasher as a Species of Greatest Conservation Need under the State Wildlife Action Plan and identified as a Priority Species under the WDFW's Priority Habitat and Species Program. Conservation concerns include declining population and range reduction occupied by the species.
