= Thrasher (surname) =

Thrasher is a surname. Notable people with the surname include:

- Buck Thrasher (1889–1938), American baseball player
- Craig Thrasher (born 1970), American alpine skier
- Daniel Thrasher (born 1993), American YouTuber and musician
- Edward L. Thrasher (1892–1971), American city councilor
- Frederic Thrasher (1892–1962), American sociologist
- Ivan Thrasher (1914–2011), Canadian politician
- John Thrasher (pioneer) (1818–1899), American city founder
- John Thrasher (Florida politician) (1943–2025), American politician
- Joseph Thrasher, American football player and coach
- Larry Thrasher (born 1959), American musician
- Michael Thrasher, British academic
- Neil Thrasher (born 1965), American country singer-songwriter
- Richard Thrasher (1922–1993), Canadian politician
- Steven Thrasher, American journalist and academic
- Sunny Besen Thrasher (born 1976), Canadian child actor
- Virginia Thrasher (born 1997), American sports shooter
