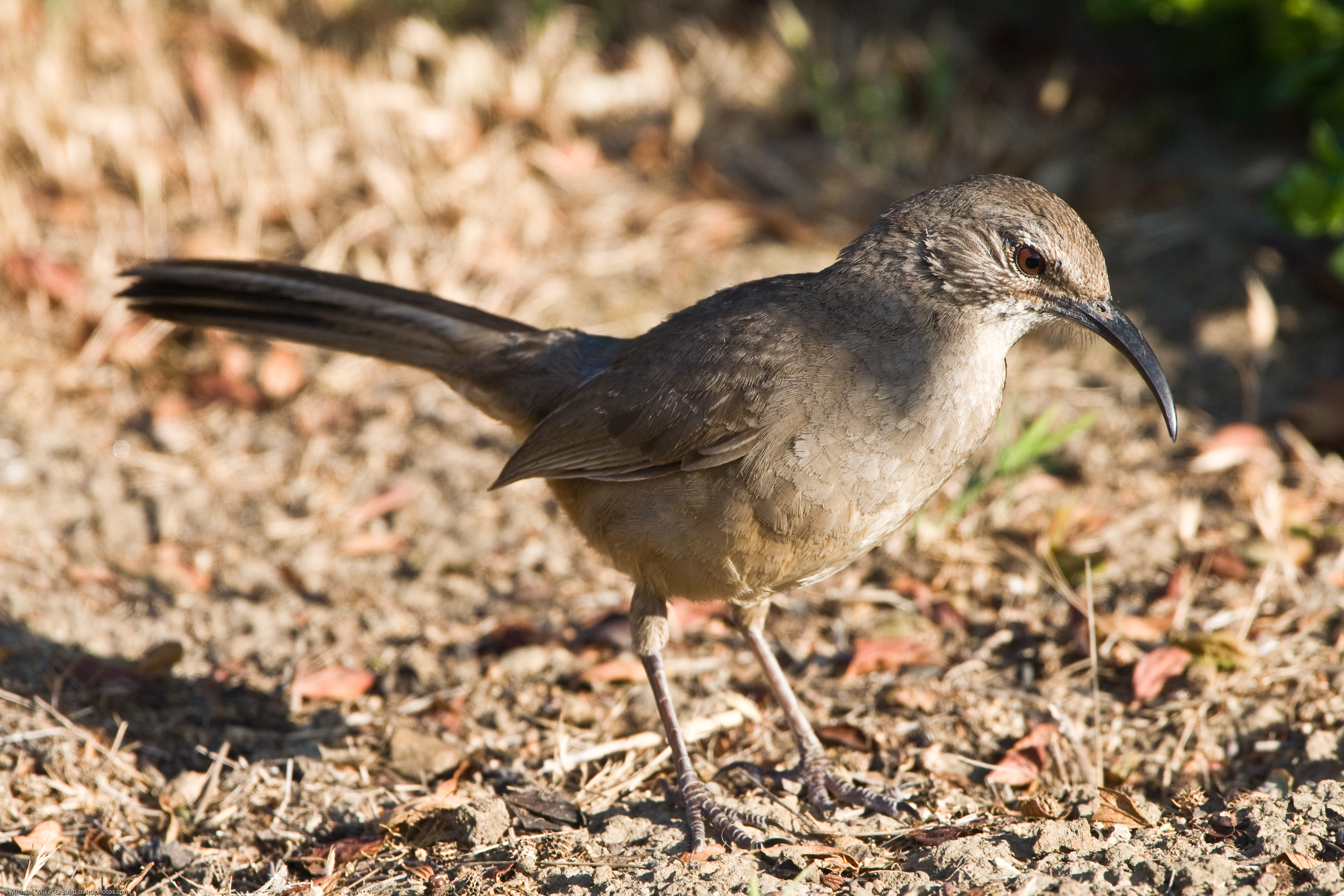
- In California

Conservation status
- Least Concern (IUCN 3.1)

Scientific classification
- Kingdom: Animalia
- Phylum: Chordata
- Class: Aves
- Order: Passeriformes
- Family: Mimidae
- Genus: Toxostoma
- Species: T. redivivum

Binomial name
- Toxostoma redivivum (Gambel, 1845)
- California thrasher range

Audio
- Song

= California thrasher =

Species of passerine bird

The California thrasher (Toxostoma redivivum) is a large member of family Mimidae found primarily in chaparral habitat in California in the United States and Baja California in Mexico. It is the only species of the genus Toxostoma throughout most of its range.

== Taxonomy and systematics ==
The California thrasher is closely related to the crissal thrasher (Toxostoma crissale) and LeConte's thrasher (T. lecontei), and the three may form a superspecies. It has two subspecies, the nominate T. r. redivivum and T. r. sonomae.

The phylogeography of the California thrasher has been explored through a study analyzing mitochondrial-DNA variation. The distribution of genealogical lineages within the species reflects a complex series of ecological and historical events that have shaped its current geographical distribution. The phylogeographic analysis sheds light on the evolutionary history and the distribution patterns of this bird across its range.

== Description ==
The California thrasher is about 32 cm (13 in) long and weighs up to 90 g (3.2 oz); it is the largest thrasher. It has a distinctive long, decurved beak and a long tail. It is generally deep grayish brown above with olive tones on the tail. It has a grayish buff supercilium, a dark cheek pattern and eye line, and unlike most thrashers, has dark eyes. The underparts are mostly buffy to tawny brown, with the upper breast and flanks a smoky gray. The two subspecies differ only slightly.

== Distribution and habitat ==
The nominate subspecies of California thrasher is found from Santa Cruz and Placer counties, California, south into northwestern Baja California, Mexico. T. r. sonomae is found from Trinity and adjoining counties in northern California southwards to the range of the nominate subspecies. There appears to be slight overlap allowing gene flow between them.

The California thrasher is a year round resident of both slopes of the California Coast Ranges and the western slope of the Sierra Nevada. It is only rarely found in the Central Valley between them. Its primary habitat is chaparral. It also inhabits sagebrush, juniper bushland, and riparian and oak woodlands with a dense understory. It is sometimes found in suburban parks and yards that have dense cover. In elevation it ranges generally as high as 1,600 m (5,200 ft) and as high as 2,000 m (6,600 ft) in southern California mountains.

The California thrasher primarily inhabits the great interior valleys of California, where it forages mainly beneath dense and continuous cover. Approximately two-thirds of its foraging activities are conducted on the ground. This bird's range is notably restricted, extending slightly beyond the state of California only towards the south.

== Behavior ==
This species' behavior is difficult to observe because it tends to keep hidden in dense cover. In the open it runs swiftly with its tail raised. The California thrasher has a distinct foraging behavior, often seeking food under dense and continuous cover. It primarily forages on the ground, making up approximately two-thirds of its foraging activity.

Studies involving color-banded thrashers have shown more about how they interact with each other socially. A male thrasher will defend his territory by chasing away rivals, and will drive out his own young from his own previous broods before a new breeding season can start. While males are the primary singers, females have also been observed to sing, especially in response to the song of a male. Confrontations between thrashers and other wildlife have also been recorded. A thrasher will repeatedly attack from the air, or defensively posture against animals if it feels threatened. However, if a threat is deemed too large then the thrasher prefers to escape by running into cover and hiding rather than flying away. This is largely due to its physical build of having strong legs and a tail which are ideal for running away.

=== Feeding ===
The California thrasher forages mostly on the ground, by digging and sweeping leaf litter and soil with its bill. It walks or hops between foraging stops. Its diet in spring is almost exclusively insects and other small invertebrates, to which it adds small soft fruits during the rest of the year. When feeding on fruits it can be in exposed situations, but is often under cover. The California thrasher has a distinct foraging behavior characterized by its habit of searching for food beneath dense and continuous cover. A significant portion of its foraging activity, around two-thirds, is conducted on the ground. The bird's choice of foraging grounds reflects its adaptation to the dense shrubbery and undergrowth common in its habitat.

=== Breeding ===
The California thrasher's core breeding season spans from February into July, though it often begins in January. It often raises two broods. Both sexes build the nest, an open cup of fine twigs and roots lined with finer material such as strips of bark and dried forbs, and placed on a platform of larger twigs. The nest is usually hidden in dense shrubs, typically between 1 and 3 m (3.3 and 9.8 ft) above ground. The clutch size is usually three to four. Both parents incubate the eggs and brood and feed the young. Common raven (Corvus corax) and California scrub jay (Aphelocoma californica) are common predators of eggs and nestlings.

The California thrasher is a monogamous species. Following egg-laying, the incubation period lasts approximately 14 days. The young are born helpless and are cared for by both parents until they leave from the nest 12 to 14 days after hatching. Nests are commonly preyed upon by skunks, lizards, racers, and cats, while adults may be hunted by predators such as the sharp-shinned hawk.

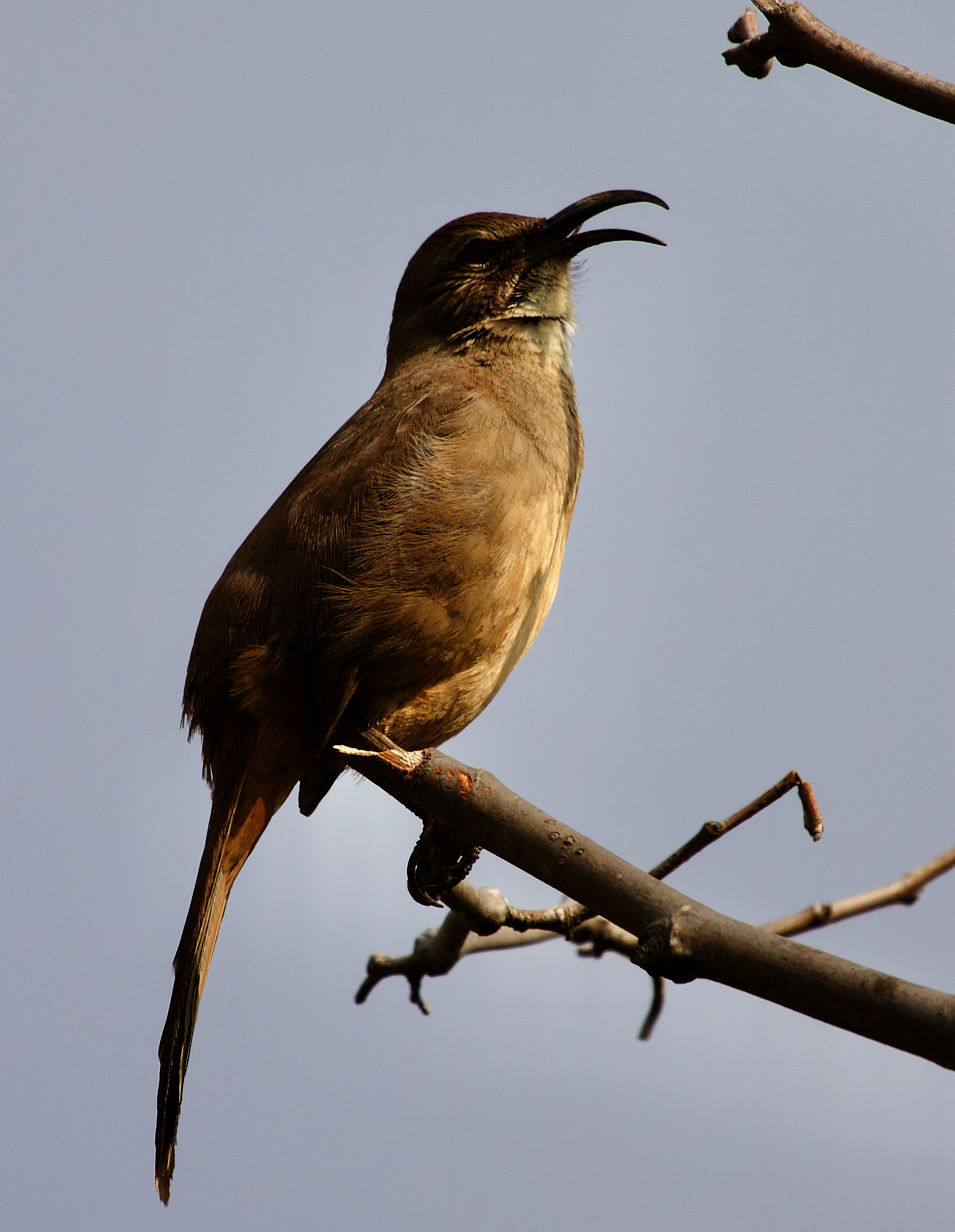
California thrasher singing

=== Vocalization ===
The California thrasher is recognized as a "striking and exuberant songster" known for its mimicking capabilities. It imitates many of the species that share its habitat, a trait that has been documented as reflecting a rich vocal repertoire, showcasing a wide range of vocal imitations from other species. Both sexes of the California thrasher engage in singing, typically from elevated and exposed perches, delivering "vigorous and 'cheerful' phrases variously repeated." The species also has a wide variety of calls distinct to its communication.

Furthermore, the California thrasher exhibits a notable sensitivity to song syntax, reacting differently to variations in song structure during playback experiments. This intricate understanding of song structure is believed to play a crucial role in territorial defense.

== Ecology ==
The California thrasher occupies a unique ecological niche, characterized by its strong association with dense undergrowth and shrubbery, which provides it with ample foraging opportunities and shelter. Its niche relationships also extend to its interactions with other bird species, forming a distinct part of the Californian fauna. The California thrasher's interactions with other bird species and wildlife within its habitat contribute to the ecological dynamics of the regions it inhabits. Its role as a forager and its territorial behavior have implications for the distribution and behavior of other species within its habitat.

== Status ==
The IUCN has assessed the California thrasher as being of Least Concern. It has a very large range, and very large population that has shown only a small decrease in recent decades. Habitat fragmentation and conversion appear to be the largest threats.

Despite its current classification as a species of Least Concern, the California thrasher has experienced population declines in specific parts of its range. These declines are most notable in coastal regions that have undergone urbanization.

The California thrasher's range is projected to be severely impacted by climate change. A climate model by the National Audubon Society classifies the species as highly vulnerable, predicting a 66% loss of its current breeding range under a 3.0 °C warming scenario. This vulnerability is linked to increased wildfire risk which threaten its natural habitat.
