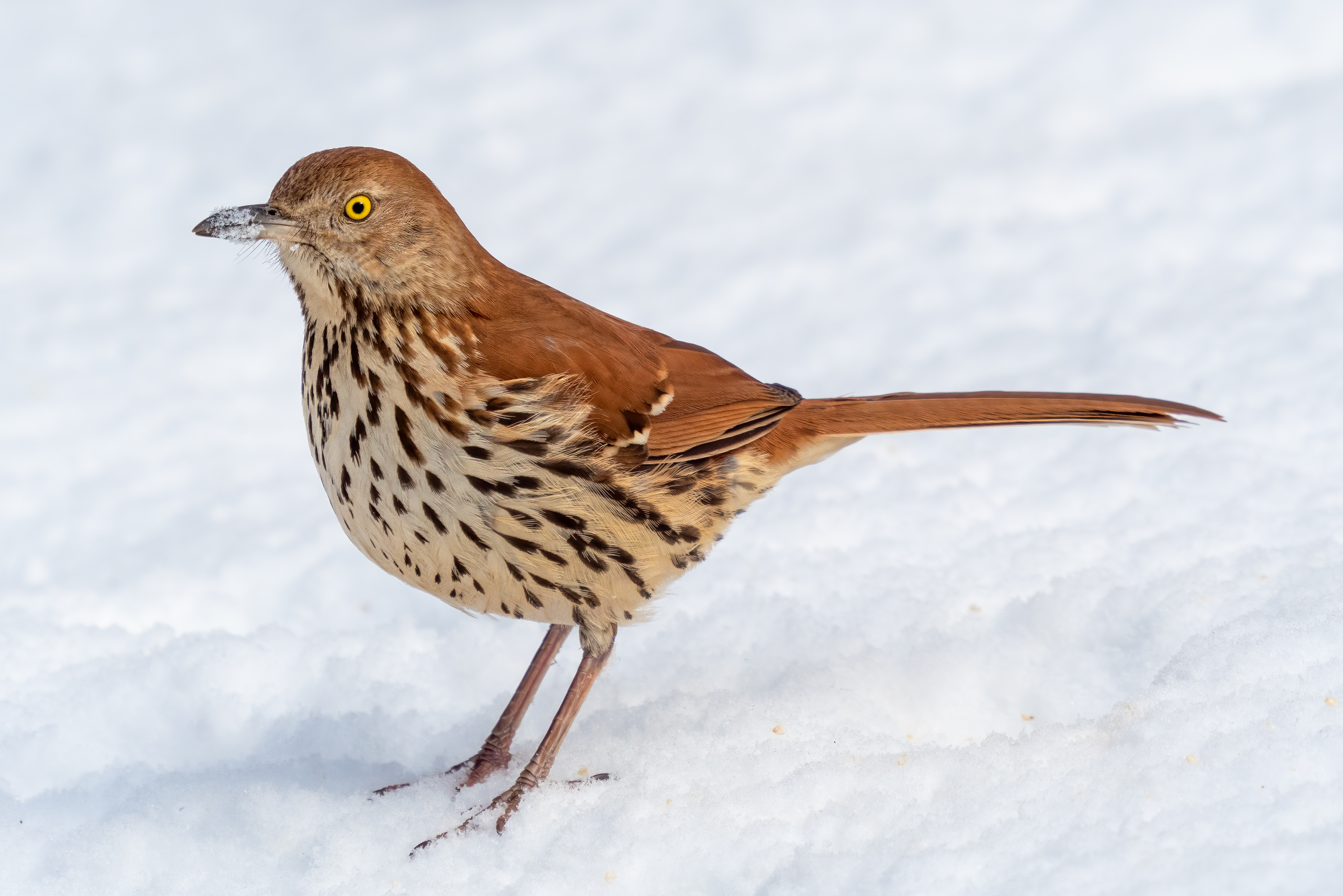
- Adult in New York, U.S.

Conservation status
- Least Concern (IUCN 3.1)

Scientific classification
- Kingdom: Animalia
- Phylum: Chordata
- Class: Aves
- Order: Passeriformes
- Family: Mimidae
- Genus: Toxostoma
- Species: T. rufum

Binomial name
- Toxostoma rufum (Linnaeus, 1758)
- Range of T. rufum Breeding range Year-round range Wintering range

Synonyms
- Turdus rufus Linnaeus, 1758; Orpheus rufus Swainson, 1831; Harporhynchus rufus Baird, 1858

= Brown thrasher =

Species of bird

The brown thrasher (Toxostoma rufum), sometimes erroneously called the brown thrush or fox-coloured thrush, is a bird in the family Mimidae, which also includes the New World catbirds and mockingbirds. The brown thrasher is abundant throughout the eastern and central United States and southern and central Canada, and it is the only thrasher to live primarily east of the Rockies and central Texas. It is the state bird of Georgia.

As a member of the genus Toxostoma, the bird is relatively large-sized among the other thrashers. It has brown upper parts with a white under part with dark streaks. Because of this, it is often confused with the smaller wood thrush (Hylocichla mustelina), among other species. The brown thrasher is noted for having over 1,000 song types, and the largest song repertoire of birds. However, each note is usually repeated in two or three phrases.

The brown thrasher is an omnivore, with its diet ranging from insects to fruits and nuts. The usual nesting areas are shrubs, small trees, or at times on ground level. Brown thrashers are generally inconspicuous but territorial birds, especially when defending their nests, and will attack species as large as humans.

== Taxonomy and naming ==
The brown thrasher was originally described by Carl Linnaeus in his landmark 1758 10th edition of Systema Naturae as Turdus rufus. The genus name Toxostoma comes from the Ancient Greek toxon, "bow" or "arch" and stoma, "mouth". The specific rufum is Latin for "red", but covers a wider range of hues than the English term.

Although not in the thrush family, this bird is sometimes erroneously called the brown thrush. The name misconception could be because the word thrasher is believed to derive from the word thrush. The naturalist Mark Catesby called it the fox-coloured thrush.

Genetic studies have found that the brown thrasher is most closely related to the long-billed and Cozumel thrashers (T. longirostre & guttatum), within the genus Toxostoma.

== Description ==
The brown thrasher is bright reddish-brown above with thin, dark streaks on its buffy underparts. It has a whitish-colored chest with distinguished teardrop-shaped markings on its chest. Its long, rufous tail is rounded with paler corners, and eyes are a brilliant yellow. Its bill is brownish, long, and curves downward. Both male and females are similar in appearance. The juvenile appearance of the brown thrasher from the adult is not remarkably different, except for plumage texture, indiscreet upper part markings, and the irises having an olive color.

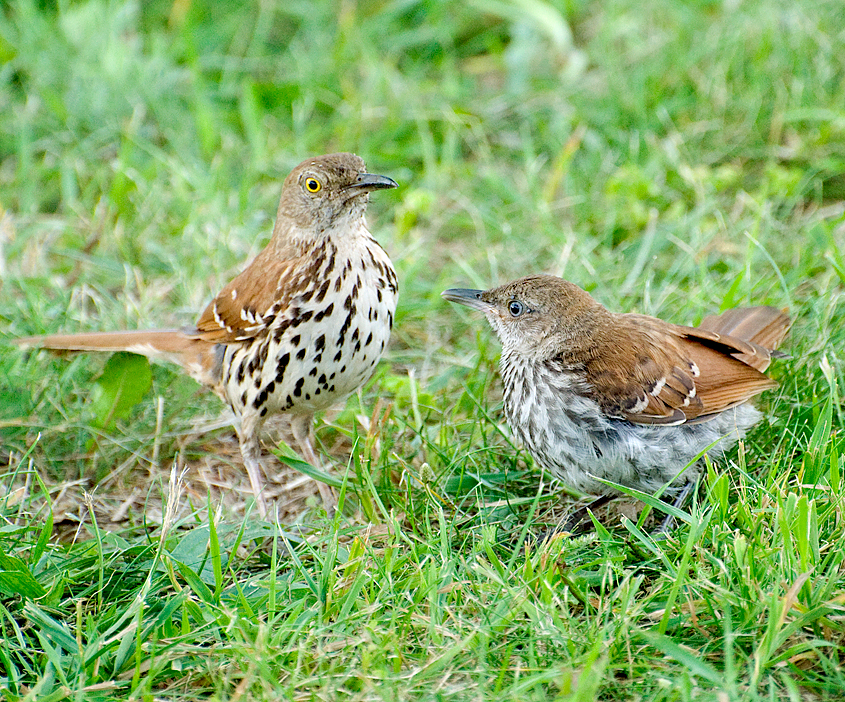
Adult with juvenile (r) in Virginia, U.S.

The brown thrasher is a fairly large passerine, although it is generally moderate in size for a thrasher, being distinctly larger than the sage thrasher (Oreoscoptes montanus) but similar or somewhat smaller in size than the more brownish Toxostoma species found further west. Adults measure around 23.5 to 30.5 cm (9.3 to 12.0 in) long with a wingspan of 29 to 33 cm (11 to 13 in), and weigh 61 to 89 g (2.2 to 3.1 oz), with an average of 68 g (2.4 oz). Among standard measurements, the wing chord is 9.5 to 11.5 cm (3.7 to 4.5 in), the tail is 10.9 to 14.1 cm (4.3 to 5.6 in), the culmen is 2.2 to 2.9 cm (0.87 to 1.14 in) and the tarsus is 3.2 to 3.6 cm (1.3 to 1.4 in). There are two subspecies: the 'brown thrasher' (T. rufum rufum), which lies in the eastern half of Canada and the United States, and the 'western brown thrasher' (T. rufum longicauda (Baird, 1858)), which resides in the central United States east of the Rocky Mountains and southern central Canada. The western brown thrasher is distinguished by a more cinnamon upper part, whiter wing bars, and darker breast spots than T.rufum rufum.

The survival rate of the brown thrasher varies on a year-to-year basis, with a survival rate the first year of 35%, 50% between the second and third year, and 75% between the third and fourth year. Disease and exposure to cold weather are among contributing factors limiting lifespan. However, the longest-lived thrasher in the wild is 12 years, and about the same in captivity.

=== Similar species ===
The similar-looking long-billed thrasher has a significantly smaller range. It has a gray head and neck, and has a longer bill than the brown thrasher. The brown thrasher's appearance is also strikingly similar to the wood thrush, the bird that it is usually mistaken for. However, the wood thrush has dark rounded spots on its under parts rather than the brown thrashers' elongated streaks, has dark eyes, shorter tail, a shorter, straighter bill (with the head generally more typical of a thrush), and is a smaller bird.

== Distribution and habitat ==
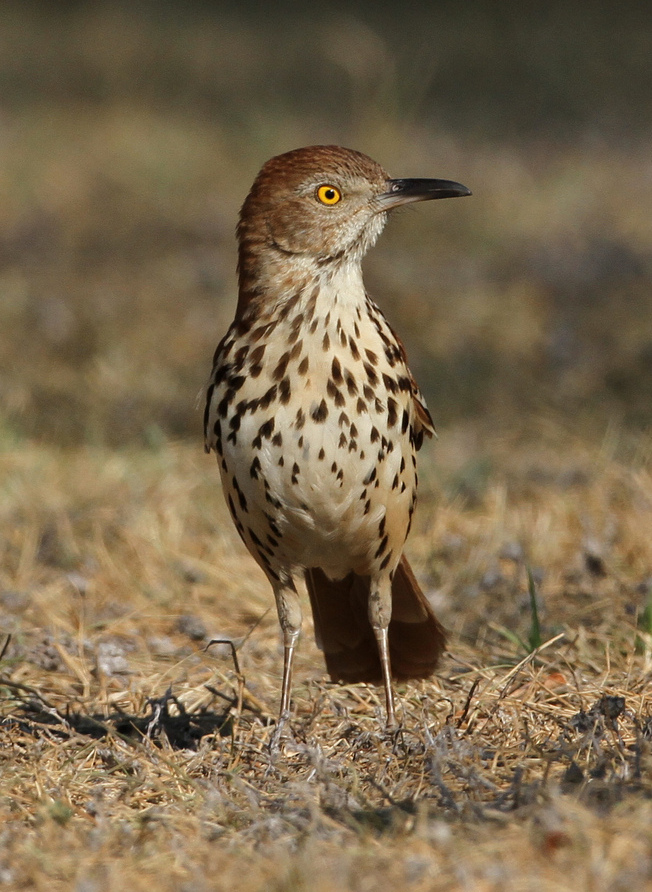
In Texas, U.S.

The brown thrasher resides in various habitats. It prefers to live in woodland edges, thickets and dense brush, often searching for food in dry leaves on the ground. It can also inhabit areas that are agricultural and near suburban areas, but is less likely to live near housing than other bird species. The brown thrasher often vies for habitat and potential nesting grounds with other birds, which is usually initiated by the males.

The brown thrasher is a strong, but partial migrant, as the bird is a year-round resident in the southern portion of its range. The breeding range includes the United States and Canada east of the Rocky Mountains, but has been occasionally spotted West of the Rockies. The increase in trees throughout the Great Plains during the past century due to fire suppression and tree planting facilitated a westward range expansion of the brown thrasher as well as range expansions of many other species of birds. Studies indicate that thrashers that reside in the New England region of the United States during the breeding season fly toward the Carolinas and Georgia, birds located in the east of the Mississippi winter from Arkansas to Georgia, and birds located in the Dakotas and the central Canadian provinces head towards eastern Texas and Louisiana. When the species does migrate, it is typically for short distances and during the night. There are also records of the bird wintering in Mexico, as well as a British record of a transatlantic vagrant.

== Behavior ==
John James Audubon's picture depicting ferruginous thrush

The brown thrasher has been observed either solo or in pairs. The brown thrasher is usually an elusive bird, and maintains its evasiveness with low-level flying. When it feels bothered, it usually hides into thickets and gives cackling calls. Thrashers spend most of their time on ground level or near it. When seen, it is commonly the males that are singing from unadorned branches. The brown thrasher has been noted for having an aggressive behavior, and is a staunch defender of its nest. However, the name does not come from attacking perceived threats, but is believed to have come from the thrashing sound the bird makes when digging through ground debris. It is also thought that the name comes from the thrashing sound that is made while it is smashing large insects to kill and eventually eat.

=== Feeding ===
This bird is omnivorous, and has a diet that includes insects, berries, nuts and seeds, as well as earthworms, snails, and sometimes lizards and frogs. Across seasons and its breeding range, it was found 63% of stomach contents were made of animal matter, the remaining 37% being plant material. During the breeding season, the diet consists primarily of beetles, grasshoppers, and other arthropods, and fruits, nuts and seeds. More than 80% of the diet of brown thrasher from Illinois is made of animal matter, about 50% being beetles. In Iowa, about 20% of the summer diet was found to consist of grasshoppers. By the late summer, it begins to shift towards more of a herbivore diet, focusing on fruits, nuts, seeds, and grains, 60% of the food in Illinois being fruits and seeds. By winter, the customary diet of the brown thrasher is fruit and acorns. Wintering birds in Texas were found to eat 58% plant material (mainly sugar berry and poison ivy) and 42% animal material in October; by March, in the dry period when food supply is generally lower, 80% of the food became animal and only 20% plants. Vertebrates are only eaten occasionally and often comprise small reptiles and amphibians, such as lizards, small or young snakes, tree frogs and salamanders.

The brown thrasher utilizes its vision while scouring for food. It usually forages for food under leaves, brushes, and soil debris on the ground using its bill. It then swipes the floor in side-to-side motions, and investigates the area it recently foraged in. The brown thrasher forages in a similar method to the long-billed thrasher and Bendire's thrasher (T. longirostre & bendirei), picking food off the ground and under leaf litter, whereas thrashers with sharply decurved bills are more likely to dig into the ground to obtain food. Foraging success is 25% greater in dry leaf litter as compared to damp leaf letter. The brown thrasher can also hammer nuts such as acorns in order to remove the shell. It has also been noted for its flexibility in catching quick insects, as the number of vertebrae in its neck exceeds that of giraffes and camels. In one case, a brown thrasher was observed to dig a hole about 1.5 cm (0.59 in) deep, place an acorn in it and hit the acorn until it cracked, considered to be a form of tool usage. In a laboratory experiment, a brown thrasher was found to be able to discern and reject the toxic eastern newt (Notophthalmus viridescens) and a palatable mimic of that species, the red salamander (Pseudotriton ruber), but continued to eat palatable dusky salamanders (Desmognathus spp.).

=== Breeding ===
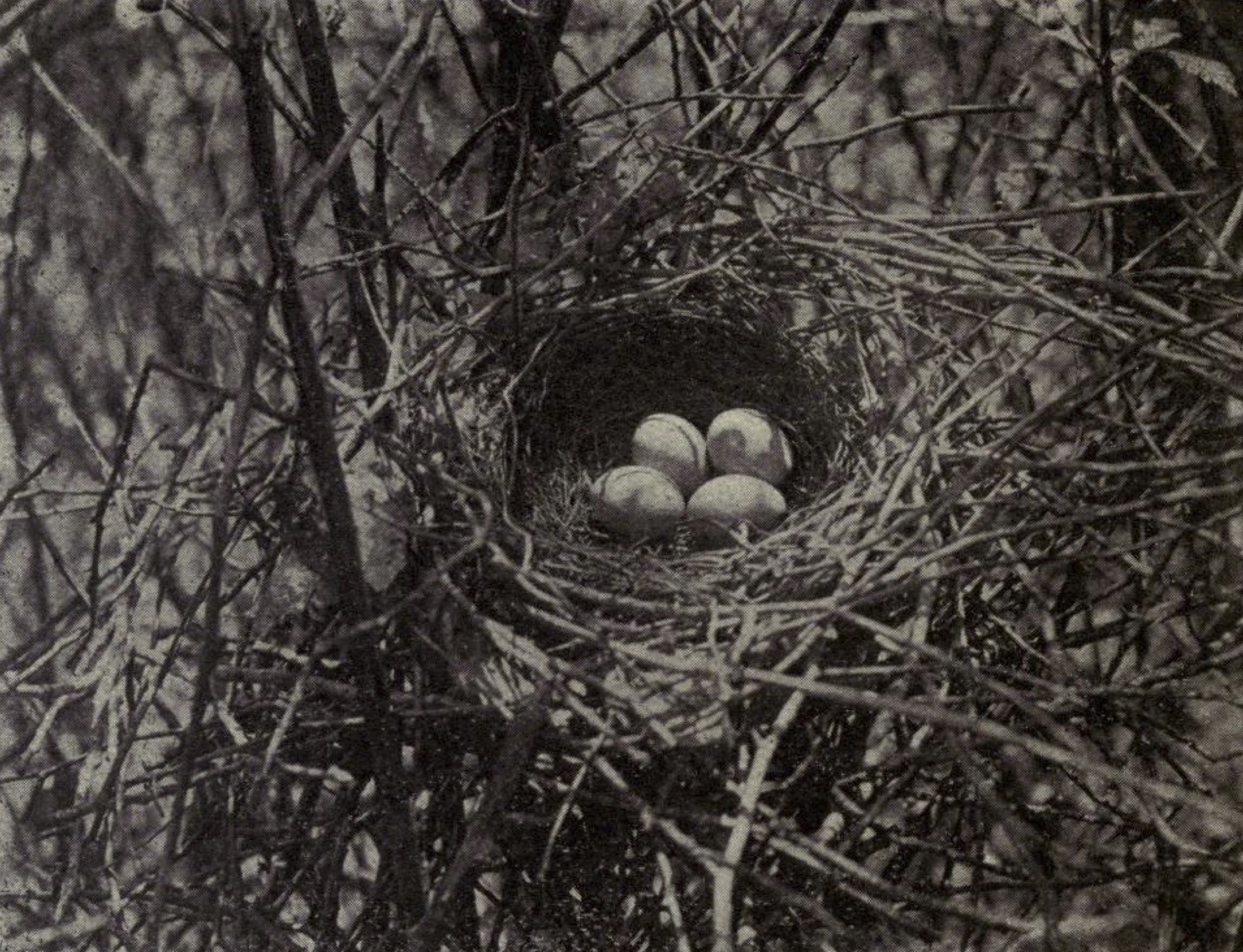
Nest and eggs

Brown thrashers are typically monogamous birds, but mate-switching does occur, at times during the same season. Their breeding season varies by region. In the southeastern United States, the breeding months begin in February and March, while May and June see the commencement of breeding in the northern portion of their breeding range. When males enter the breeding grounds, their territory can range from 2 to 10 acres (0.81 to 4.05 ha). Around this time of the year the males are usually at their most active, singing loudly to attract potential mates, and are found on top of perches. The courting ritual involves the exchanging of probable nesting material. Males will sing gentler as they sight a female, and this enacts the female to grab a twig or leaf and present it to the male, with flapping wings and chirping sounds. The males might also present a gift in response and approach the female. Both sexes will take part in nest building once mates find each other, and will mate after the nest is completed.

The female lays 3 to 5 eggs, that usually appears with a blueish or greenish tint along with reddish-brown spots. There are rare occurrences of no spots on the eggs. The nest is built twiggy, lined with grass, leaves, and other forms of dead vegetation. The nests are typically built in a dense shrub or low in a tree, usually up to 2.1 m (6.9 ft) high, but have built nests as high as 6 m (20 ft). They also on occasion build nests on the ground. Between eleven days to two weeks, the eggs hatch. Both parents incubate the eggs and feed the young, with the female doing most of the incubating. Nine to thirteen days after hatching, the nestlings begin to fledge. These birds raise two, sometimes even three, broods in a year. The male sings a series of short repeated melodious phrases from an open perch to declare his territory, and is also very aggressive in defending the nest, known to strike people and animals.

=== Vocal development ===
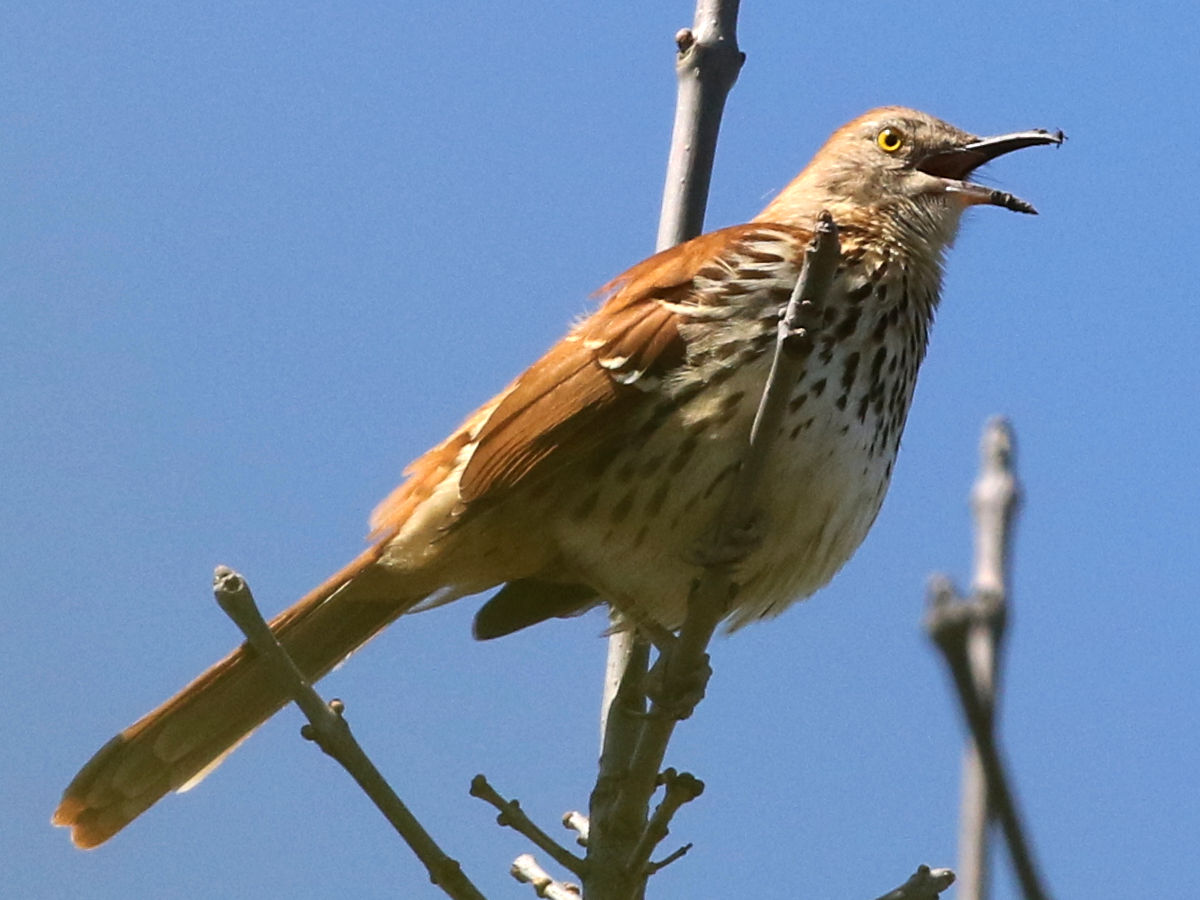
Singing, Illinois

Brown thrasher song

Brown thrasher song

Brown thrasher

The male brown thrasher may have the largest song repertoire of any North American bird, which has been documented to be over 1,000 songs. Some sources state that each individual has up to 3,000 song phrases, while others put the number beyond 3,000. The males' singing voice usually contains more of a melodic tone than that of the related grey catbird. Songs are coherent phrases that are iterated no more than three times, but may be done for minutes at a time. By the fall, the male sings with smoother sub-songs. During the winter, the males may also sing in short spurts during altercations with neighboring males.

Juveniles make alarm noises. As an adult, the brown thrasher has an array of sounds it will make in various situations. Both males and females make smack and teeooo-like alarm calls when provoked, and hijjj sounds at dusk and dawn. Others calls may consist of an acute, sudden chakk, rrrrr, a Tcheh sound in the beginning that ends with an eeeur, kakaka, and sounds reminiscent of a stick scraping a concrete sidewalk. Brown thrashers are noted for their mimicry (as a member of the family Mimidae), but they are not as diverse in this category as their relative the northern mockingbird. However, during the breeding season, the mimicking ability of the male is at its best display, impersonating sounds from tufted titmice (Baeolophus bicolor), northern cardinals (Cardinalis cardinalis), wood thrushes, northern flickers (Colaptes auratus), among other species.

== Predation and threats ==
Although this bird is widespread and still common, it has declined in numbers in some areas due to loss of suitable habitat. Despite the decrease, the rate does not warrant a status towards vulnerable. One of the natural nuisances is the parasitic brown-headed cowbird (Molothrus ater), but these incidents are rare. Whenever these situations occur, the brown thrashers usually discard the cowbirds' eggs. Occasionally, the thrasher has thrown out their own eggs instead of the cowbird eggs due to similar egg size, and at least one recorded event raised a fledgling. Northern cardinals and grey catbirds are also major competitors for thrashers in terms of territorial gain. Because of the apparent lack of opportunistic behavior around species like these, thrashers are prone to be driven out of zones for territory competition. Brown thrashers have tendencies to double-brood or have failures on their first nesting attempts due to predation. Grey catbirds have been seen invading brown thrashers' nests and breaking their eggs. Other than the catbird, snakes, birds of prey, and cats are among the top predators of the thrasher. In Kansas, at least eight species of snake were identified as potentially serious sources of nest failure. Among the identified avian predators of adults are Cooper's hawks (Accipiter cooperii), northern goshawk (Accipiter gentilis), broad-winged hawks (Buteo platypterus), merlins (Falco columbarius), peregrine falcons (Falco peregrinus), eastern screech-owls (Megascops asio), great horned owls (Bubo virginianus) barred owls (Strix varia) and long-eared owls (Asio otus).

Brown thrasher defence methods include using its bill, which can inflict significant damage to smaller species, along with wing-flapping and vocal expressions.

== State bird ==
The brown thrasher is the state bird of Georgia. The brown thrasher also was the inspiration for the name of Atlanta's former National Hockey League team, the Atlanta Thrashers.
