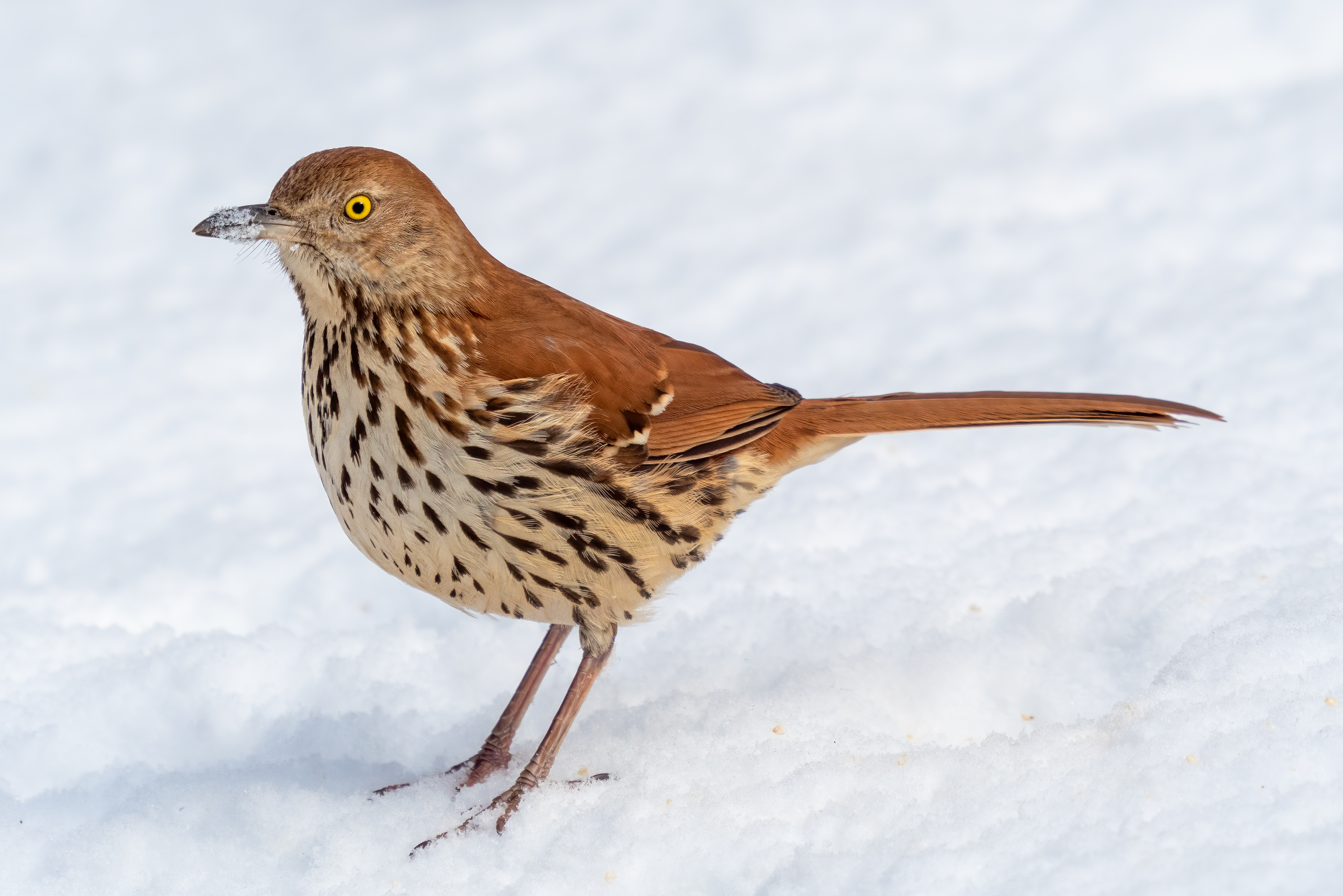
- Brown thrasher (Toxostoma rufum)

Scientific classification
- Kingdom: Animalia
- Phylum: Chordata
- Class: Aves
- Order: Passeriformes
- Family: Mimidae
- Genus: Toxostoma; Wagler, 1831

Type species
- Toxostoma vetula Wagler, 1831=Orpheus curvirostris Swainson, 1827

= Toxostoma =

Genus of birds

Toxostoma is a genus of birds in the family Mimidae. This genus contains most of the birds called thrashers, and accordingly members of this genus are sometimes referred to as the "typical thrashers". They are found in the United States and Mexico.

== Taxonomy ==
The genus Toxostoma was introduced in 1831 by the German naturalist Johann Georg Wagler to accommodate a single species, Toxostoma vetula Wagler. This is a junior synonym of Orpheus curvirostris, the curve-billed thrasher, that was described by William Swainson in 1827. The genus name combines the Ancient Greek τοξον/toxon meaning "bow" or "arch" with στομα/stoma, στοματος/stomatos meaning "mouth".

== Description ==
Birds placed in this genus measure from 22 to 32 cm (8.7 to 12.6 in) in length. The tail is straight and quite long, as much or more than the body. As in the mulattoes and the mockingbirds, the bill is curved downwards, and is generally long, although it varies according to the species. Its plumage is opaque, brownish or greyish, with darker wings and tail. On the wings there are usually stripes of a lighter shade. The feathers on the throat, chest and belly are usually light (white or greyish) and in most species these parts of the body have dark spots. The eyes can be yellow, orange or reddish.

They generally feed on insects, but also on fruits, seeds, worms, molluscs and, occasionally, small reptiles.

Most are songbirds that make musical sounds, and are therefore prized as cage birds. Some species are partial migrants and in summer move to the south of their nesting area. They prefer desert or semi-desert habitats and areas of shrubby vegetation; some species inhabit forests, and only one, the Cozumel thrasher, is tropical.

== Species ==
The genus contains the following ten species:

Image	Scientific name	Common name	Distribution
	Toxostoma ocellatum	Ocellated thrasher	Mexico between Puebla and Oaxaca
	Toxostoma rufum	Brown thrasher	eastern and central United States and southern and central Canada
	Toxostoma guttatum	Cozumel thrasher	island of Cozumel off the Yucatán Peninsula, Mexico
	Toxostoma bendirei	Bendire's thrasher	southwestern United States and northwestern Mexico.
	Toxostoma curvirostre	Curve-billed thrasher	Mexico and to the deserts of southwestern United States.
	Toxostoma lecontei	LeConte's thrasher	southwestern United States and northwestern Mexico.
	Toxostoma crissale	Crissal thrasher	southwestern United States (western Texas, southern New Mexico, southern Arizona, southeastern California, extreme southern Nevada, and extreme southwestern Utah) to central Mexico
	Toxostoma redivivum	California thrasher	California and Baja California
	Toxostoma cinereum	Gray thrasher	Baja California peninsula of Mexico
	Toxostoma longirostre	Long-billed thrasher	South Texas and eastern Mexico
