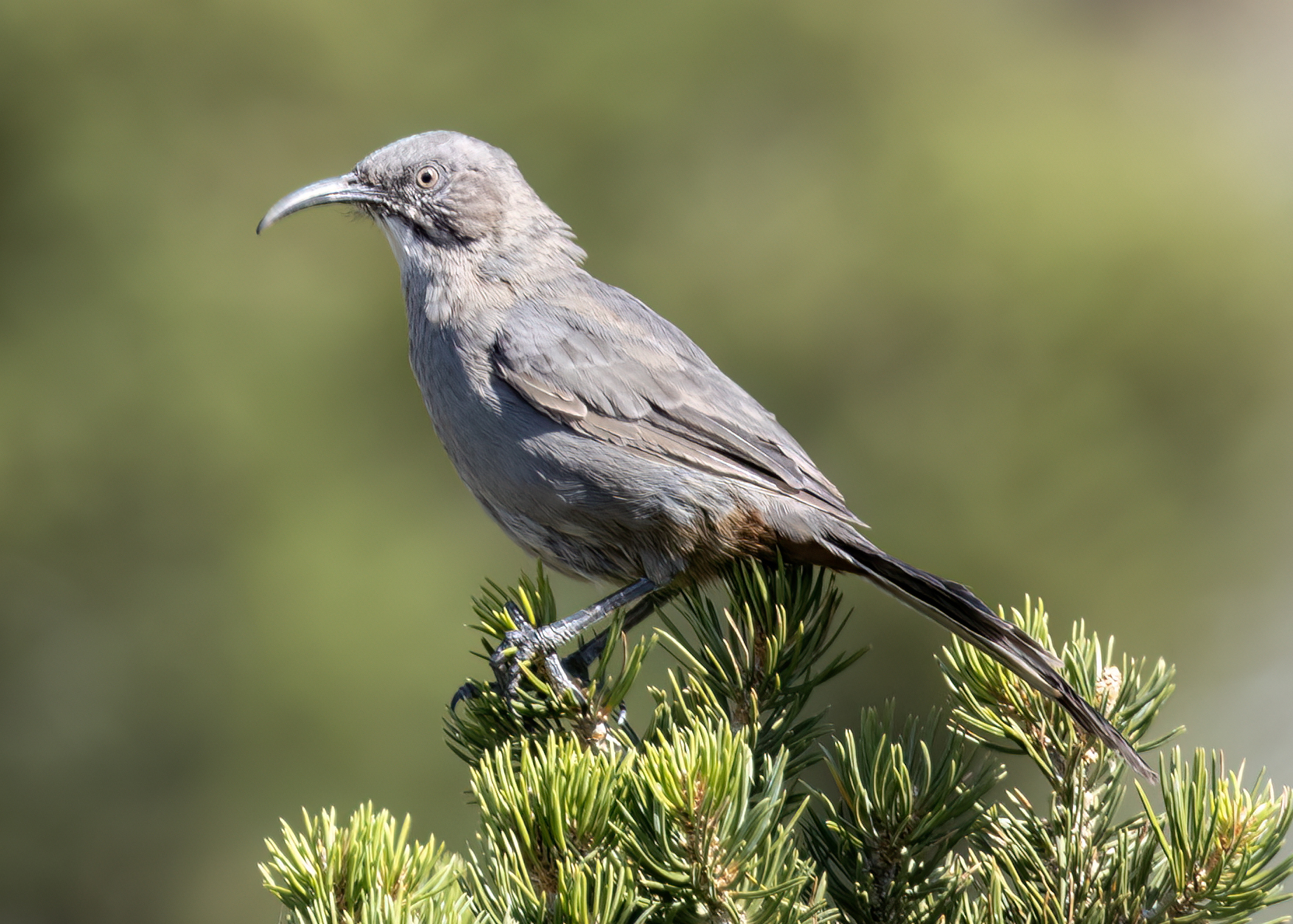

Conservation status
- Least Concern (IUCN 3.1)

Scientific classification
- Kingdom: Animalia
- Phylum: Chordata
- Class: Aves
- Order: Passeriformes
- Family: Mimidae
- Genus: Toxostoma
- Species: T. crissale

Binomial name
- Toxostoma crissale Henry, 1858
- Crissal thrasher range

= Crissal thrasher =

Species of bird

The crissal thrasher (Toxostoma crissale) is a large thrasher found in the Southwestern United States (western Texas, southern New Mexico, southern Arizona, southeastern California, extreme southern Nevada, and extreme southwestern Utah) to central Mexico.

== Description ==
The bird grows to 32 centimetres (13 in), and has a deeply curved bill. The eyes are dull yellow. Bird expert Roger Tory Peterson described its singing as sweeter and less spasmodic than other thrashers. It can be found near desert streams in dense underbrush, mesquite thickets, willows, scrub oak, high elevations in manzanita, and in the low desert near canyon chaparral. The bird seldom flies in the open. As such, the crissal thrasher rarely flies, preferring to walk or run around its territory and will mostly run for cover when disturbed by a potential predator. The bird's name is derived from the characteristic bright coloring, in contrast to the balance of its plumage, of the area between its tail and vent—a region known as the crissum.

== History ==
In the early years of the study of the birds of western North America, this species was confused with the California thrasher (Toxostoma redivivum), to which it is closely related. Descriptions of T. redivivum in John Cassin's 1856 book Illustrations of the Birds of California, Texas, Oregon, British, and Russian America led later ornithologists to conclude that at least three of the birds described were actually the crissal thrasher. When an army surgeon working in New Mexico sent Cassin specimens of a bird that he believed to be the California thrasher, Cassin sent the specimens to Spencer Baird at the Smithsonian Institution. Baird determined that it was not a California thrasher and published his findings in 1858, identifying the crissal thrasher as a new species.

Printer's errors in Baird's 1858 publication led to longstanding confusion and contention over the naming of the crissal thrasher. As printed, Baird's publication identified the new species as Toxostoma dorsalis, because the printer had switched the species name of the new thrasher with the species name of a new junco species, Junco dorsalis. Baird arranged for the error to be corrected, recording the name as T. crissalis the following month. Thereafter, the T. crissalis name was accepted and used until 1920, when ornithologist Harry Oberholser published a note asserting that T. dorsalis must be used instead because it had publication priority over T. crissalis, even though the original publication had been a mistake and had been quickly corrected. As a result, the T. dorsalis epithet appeared in ornithological literature until 1983, when the International Commission on Zoological Nomenclature formally restored Baird's intended name of T. crissale.

== Nest ==
The crissal thrasher builds its nests in dense shrubs at heights of three to eight feet, typically under a large branch for protection: both from other birds and the sun. The male and female cooperate in building the cup-shaped nest, which is constructed from twigs and lined with finer vegetation. The eggs, which are blue in color and lack spots (this is the only species of thrasher to lay eggs without spots), are laid in clutches of 2 to 3 eggs and incubated for about 2 weeks, with both the male and female taking turns on the nest. The young are fledged 11 to 13 days after they hatch. The chick is paler and duller than the adult, with a browner undertail.

== Diet ==
The species is an omnivore, eating both insects and spiders, and seeds and fruits. The crissal thrasher is mainly a ground feeder, using its long bill to probe for its prey amongst the leaf litter, particularly under shrubs.
