= Joseph Thrasher =

American football player and coach

Current position
- Title: Head coach
- Team: Hartfield Academy (MS)

Playing career
- 1998–2000: Belhaven

Coaching career (HC unless noted)
- 2001–2003: Mississippi School for the Deaf
- 2005: Belhaven (assistant)
- 2006–2008: Bacone
- 2009–2013: Belhaven
- 2014–2020: Hartfield Academy (MS)

Head coaching record
- Overall: 37–50 (college)

Joseph Thrasher is an American football coach and former player. He is the former head football coach at the Hartfield Academy in Flowood, Mississippi. Previously Thrasher served as head coach at Bacone College from 2006 to 2008 and Belhaven University from 2009 to 2013.

== Coaching career ==
=== Bacone ===
Thrasher was the second head football coach for the Bacone Warriors located in Muskogee, Oklahoma and he held that position for three seasons, from 2006 until 2008. His coaching record at Bacone was 13–19.

=== Belhaven ===
In 2009, Thrasher became the fifth head football coach for the Belhaven Blazers located in Jackson, Mississippi. His coaching record at Belhaven is 24–31.

== Head coaching record ==
=== College ===
Year	Team	Overall	Conference	Standing
Bacone Warriors (Central States Football League) (2006–2008)
2006	Bacone	2–8	1–3	T–4th
2007	Bacone	4–7	1–3	4th
2008	Bacone	7–4	3–1	2nd
Bacone:		13–19	5–7	
Belhaven Blazers (Mid-South Conference) (2009–2013)
2009	Belhaven	6–5	4–2	T–2nd (West)
2010	Belhaven	4–7	1–5	7th (West)
2011	Belhaven	5–6	3–3	T–4th (West)
2012	Belhaven	6–5	4–2	T–2nd (West)
2013	Belhaven	3–8	1–4	5th (West)
Belhaven:		24–31	13–16	
Total:		37–50		
