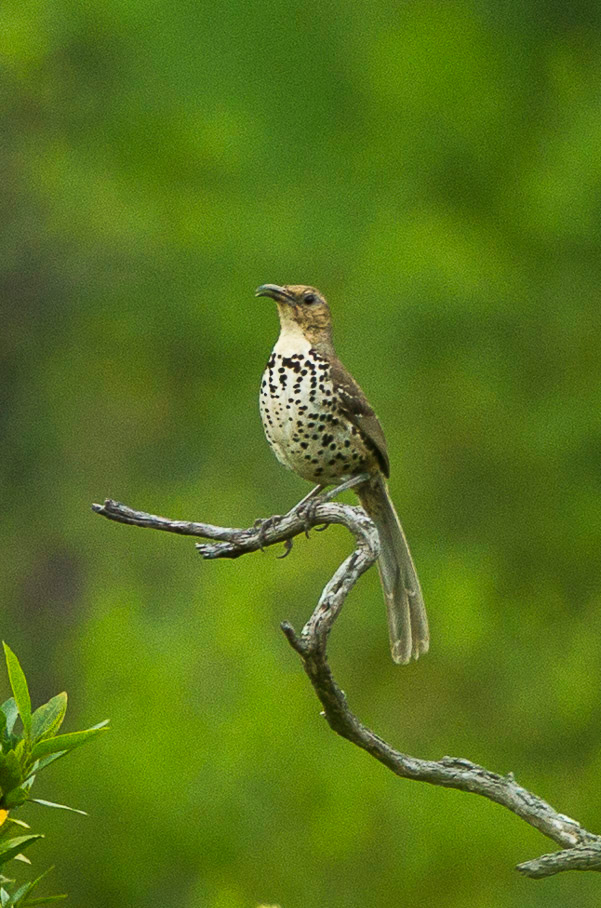

Conservation status
- Least Concern (IUCN 3.1)

Scientific classification
- Domain: Eukaryota
- Kingdom: Animalia
- Phylum: Chordata
- Class: Aves
- Order: Passeriformes
- Family: Mimidae
- Genus: Toxostoma
- Species: T. ocellatum

Binomial name
- Toxostoma ocellatum (Sclater, PL, 1862)

= Ocellated thrasher =

Species of bird

The ocellated thrasher (Toxostoma ocellatum) is a species of bird in the family Mimidae. It is endemic to Mexico.

== Taxonomy and systematics ==
The ocellated thrasher has two subspecies, the nominate T. o. ocellatum and T. o. villai.

== Description ==
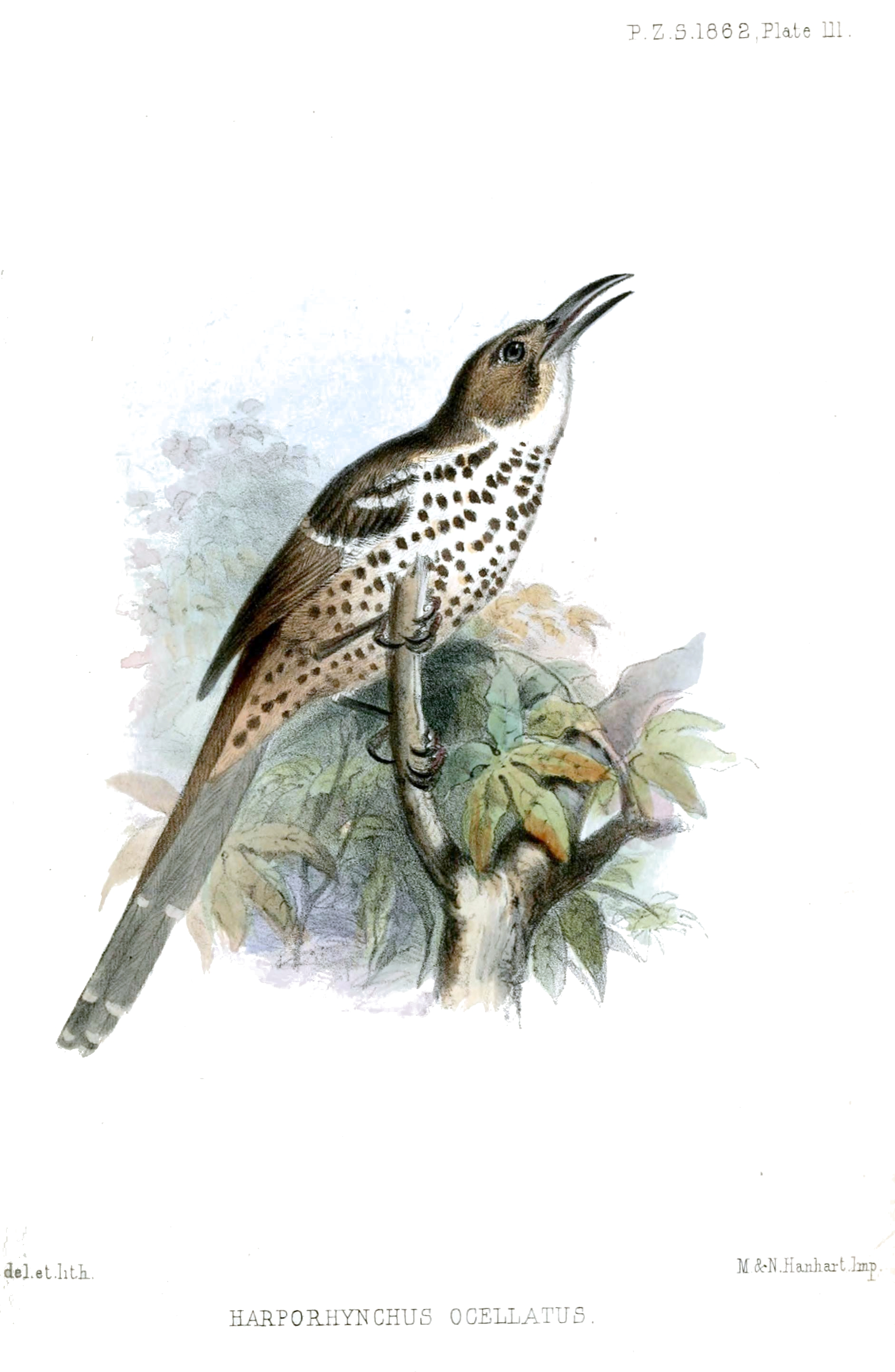
Illustration (1862) of Toxostoma ocellatum

The ocellated thrasher is 26.5 to 29.5 cm (10.4 to 11.6 in) long; 14 specimens weighed 77.3 to 95.8 g (2.73 to 3.38 oz). Adults' upperparts are dark brown and have a slight olive wash. They have a dull white to buff supercilium and brown cheeks. The folded wings show two white bars and the outer tail feathers have narrow white tips. The underparts are whitish darkening to buff on the belly and brown on the flanks. The breast, sides, and flanks have bold black spots.

== Distribution and habitat ==
The nominate subspecies of ocellated thrasher is found in central Mexico from San Luis Potosí south to the states of Hidalgo and México. T. o. villai is found in southern Mexico between Puebla and Oaxaca.

The ocellated thrasher inhabits a variety of landscapes including arid and semi-arid scrub and the brushy understory of oak and pine-oak forests. In elevation it ranges from 1,400 to 3,000 m (4,600 to 9,800 ft).

== Behavior ==
=== Feeding ===
The ocellated thrasher forages mostly in dense vegetation, on the ground or near it. Though its diet has not been documented, it is presumed to be mostly arthropods, other invertebrates, and possibly fruit.

=== Breeding ===
Very little is known about the ocellated thrasher's breeding phenology. Its nest is a cup made of twigs and grass sited in a bush or tree. The clutch size is believed to be two.

=== Vocalization ===
The ocellated thrasher's song is "a varied, rich warbling in which phrases are repeated two or three times", often sung from atop a bush or tree. Its calls include "a hard, slightly smacking to gruff chehk or tchehk".

== Status ==
The IUCN has assessed the ocellated thrasher as being of Least Concern. However, it has a fairly small range and its population and population trend are unknown.
