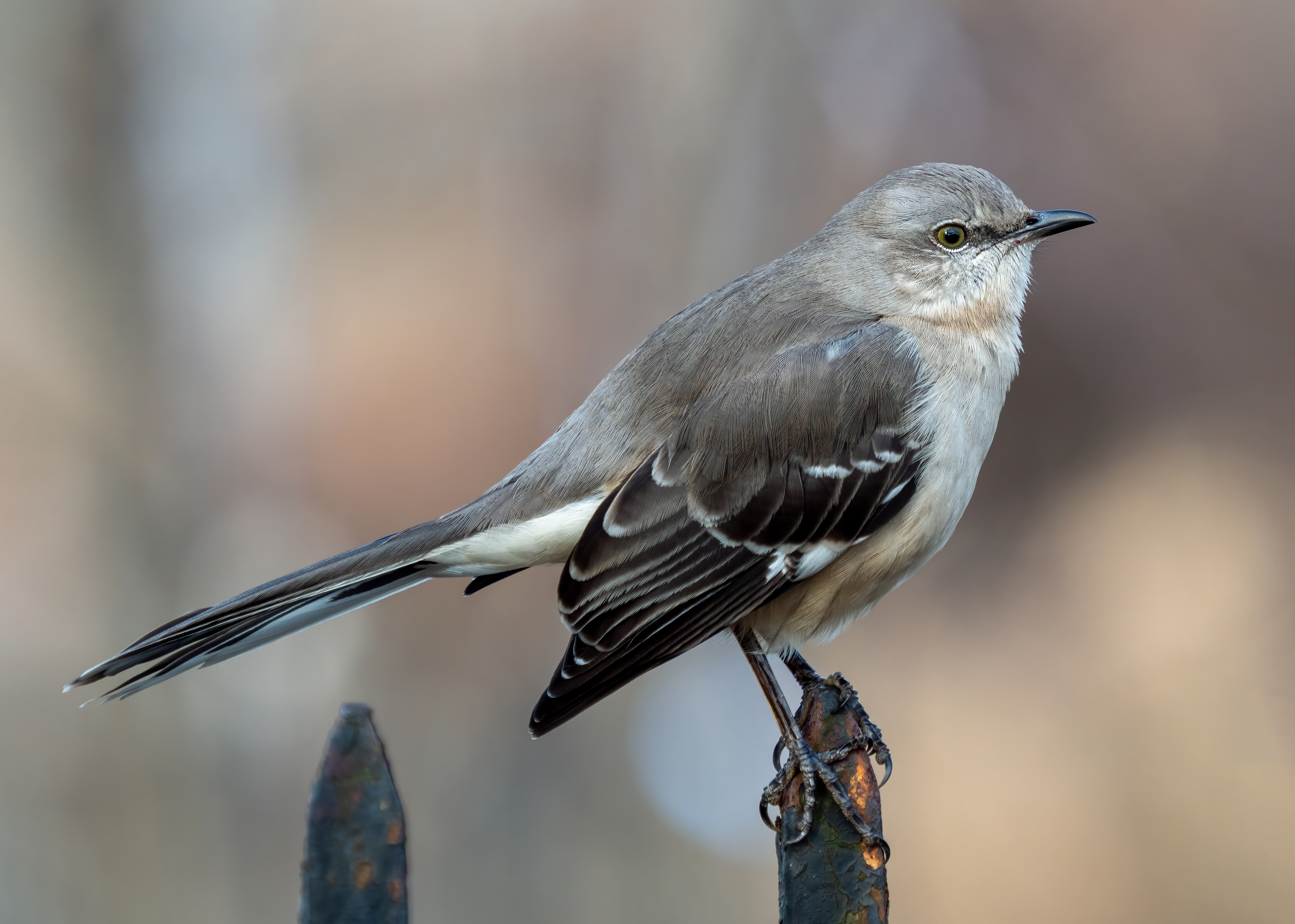
- Northern mockingbird Mimus polyglottos

Scientific classification
- Kingdom: Animalia
- Phylum: Chordata
- Class: Aves
- Order: Passeriformes
- Superfamily: Muscicapoidea
- Family: Mimidae

Genera
- Melanotis; Mimus

= Mockingbird =

Family of birds

Mockingbirds are a group of New World passerine bird from the family Mimidae. They are best known for the habit of some species mimicking the songs of other birds and the sounds of insects and amphibians, often loudly and in rapid succession and for being extremely territorial when raising hatchlings. Studies have shown the ability of some species to identify individual humans and treat them differently based on learned threat assessments.

The only mockingbird commonly found in North America is the northern mockingbird. Mockingbirds are known for singing late at night, even past midnight.

They are opportunistic omnivores, feeding on insects, fruits, seeds, and occasional greens.

Audio recording of mockingbird. Note the variety of vocalizations

The northern mockingbird is the state bird of five states in the United States, a trend that was started in 1920, when the Texas Federation of Women's Clubs proposed the idea. In January 1927, Governor Dan Moody approved this, and Texas became the first state ever to choose a state bird. Since then, Arkansas, Florida, Mississippi, and Tennessee have also adopted the northern mockingbird as their official state bird.

== Taxonomy ==
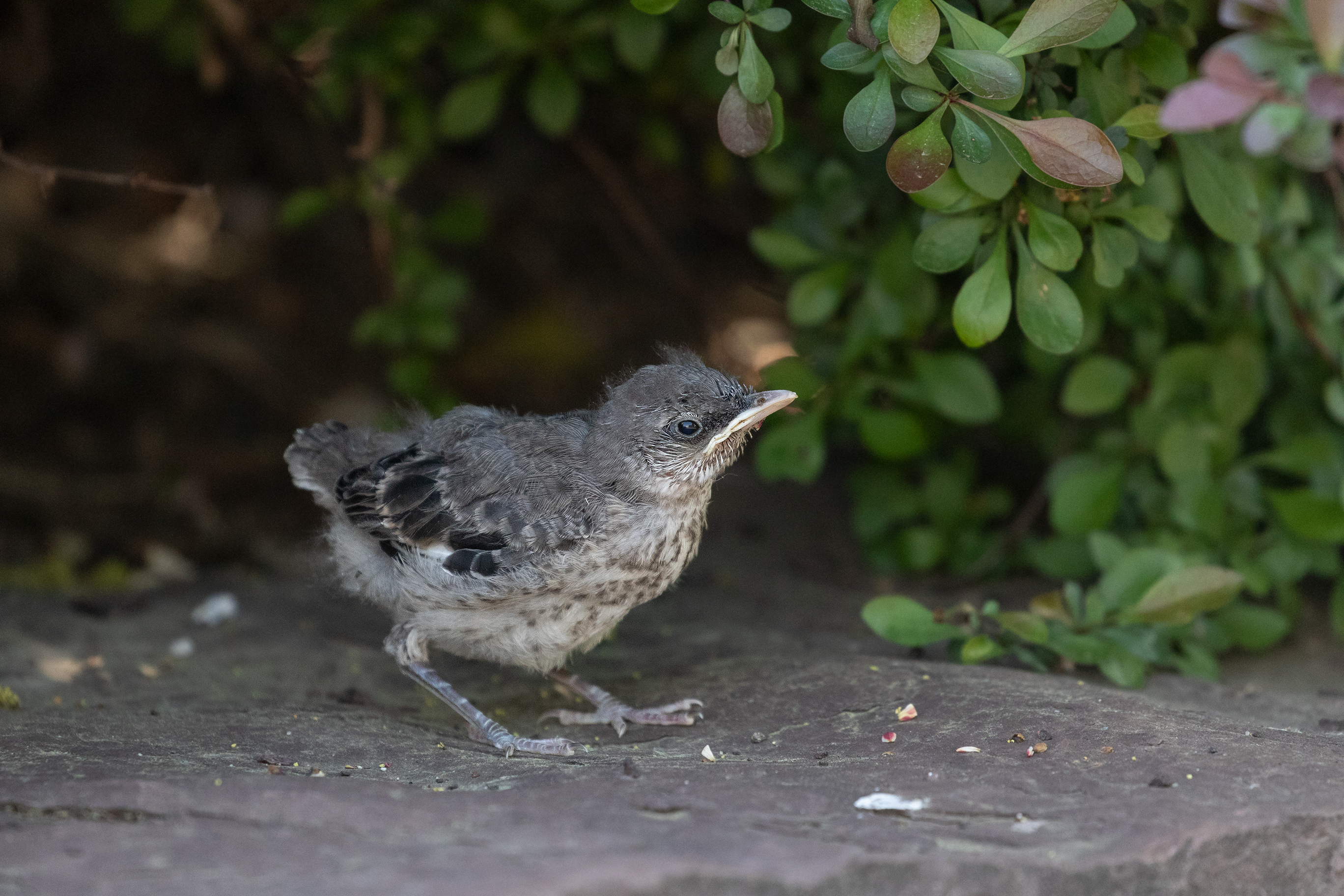
Fledgling stage of the northern mockingbird

There are about 17 species in two genera, although three species of mockingbird from the Galápagos Islands were formerly separated into a third genus, Nesomimus. The mockingbirds do not appear to form a monophyletic lineage, as Mimus and Melanotis are not each other's closest relatives; instead, Melanotis appears to be more closely related to the catbirds, while the closest living relatives of Mimus appear to be thrashers, such as the sage thrasher.

== Species in taxonomic order ==
Mimus:

- Brown-backed mockingbird, Mimus dorsalis
- Bahama mockingbird, Mimus gundlachii
- Long-tailed mockingbird, Mimus longicaudatus
- Patagonian mockingbird, Mimus patagonicus
- Chilean mockingbird, Mimus thenca
- White-banded mockingbird, Mimus triurus
- Northern mockingbird, Mimus polyglottos
- Socorro mockingbird, Mimus graysoni
- Tropical mockingbird, Mimus gilvus
- Chalk-browed mockingbird, Mimus saturninus

Formerly Nesomimus (endemic to the Galapagos):

- Hood mockingbird, Mimus macdonaldi
- Galápagos mockingbird, Mimus parvulus
- Floreana mockingbird or Charles mockingbird, Mimus trifasciatus
- San Cristóbal mockingbird, Mimus melanotis

Melanotis:

- Blue mockingbird, Melanotis caerulescens
- Blue-and-white mockingbird, Melanotis hypoleucus

== Charles Darwin ==
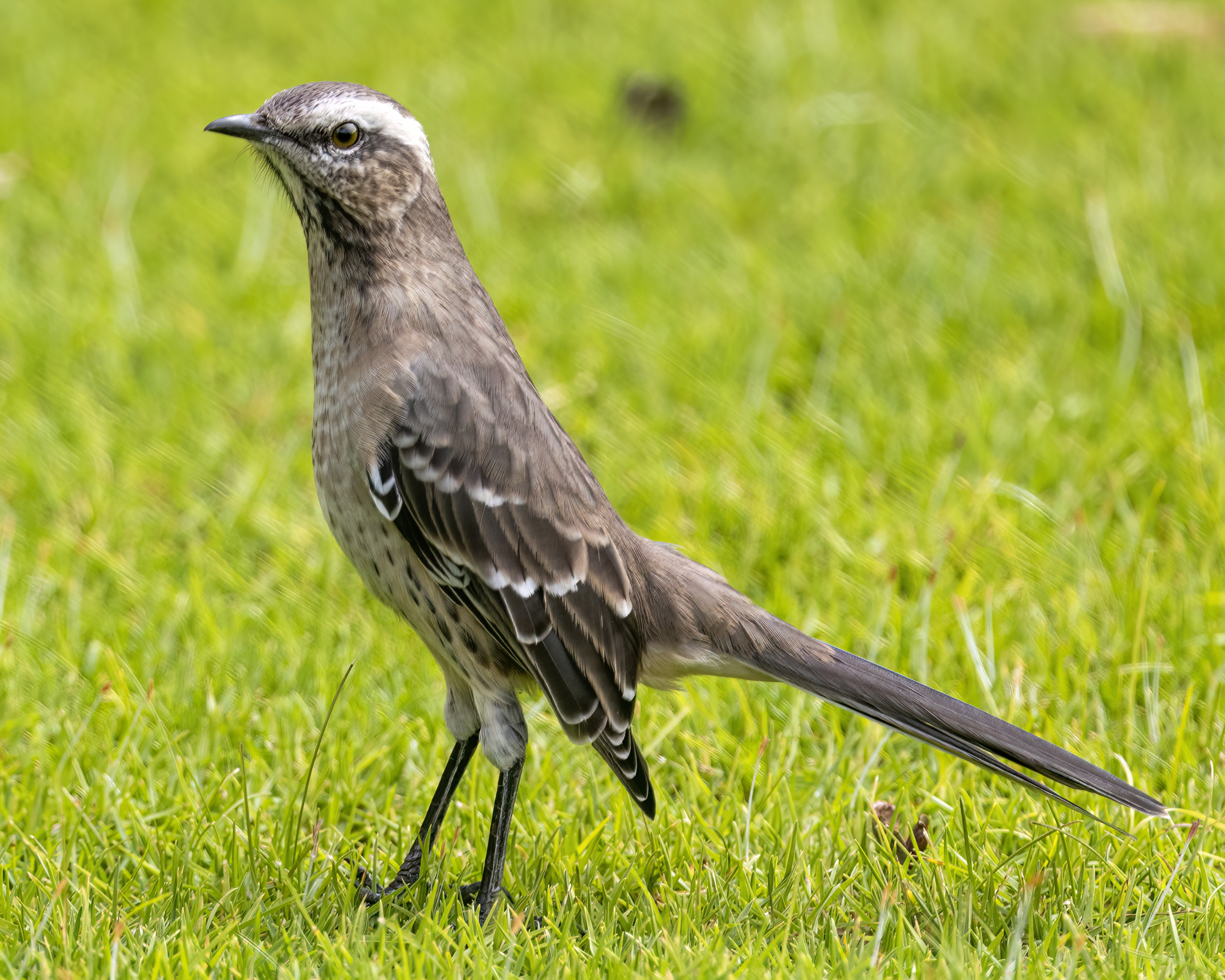
The Chilean mockingbird, Mimus thenca

When the survey voyage of HMS Beagle visited the Galápagos Islands in September to October 1835, the naturalist Charles Darwin noticed that the mockingbirds Mimus thenca differed from island to island, and were closely allied in appearance to mockingbirds on the South American mainland. Nearly a year later when writing up his notes on the return voyage he speculated that this, together with what he had been told about Galápagos tortoises, could undermine the doctrine of stability of species. This was his first recorded expression of doubts about species being immutable, which led to his being convinced about the transmutation of species and hence evolution.
