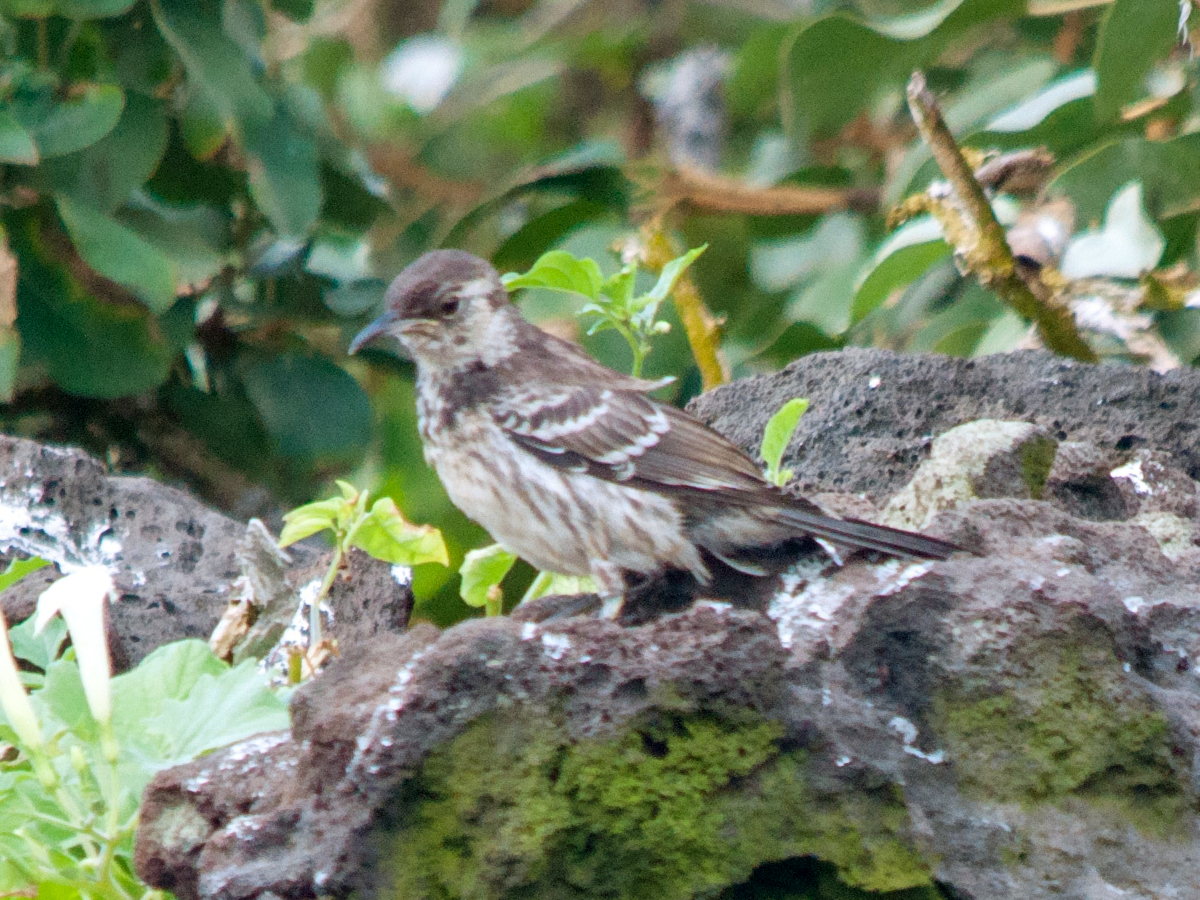

Conservation status
- Endangered (IUCN 3.1)

Scientific classification
- Kingdom: Animalia
- Phylum: Chordata
- Class: Aves
- Order: Passeriformes
- Family: Mimidae
- Genus: Mimus
- Species: M. trifasciatus

Binomial name
- Mimus trifasciatus (Gould, 1837)

Synonyms
- Nesomimus trifasciatus

= Floreana mockingbird =

Species of bird

The Floreana mockingbird (Mimus trifasciatus) or the Charles Island mockingbird, is a species of bird in the family Mimidae. It was endemic to Floreana, one of the Galápagos Islands, but now is found only on two nearby islets, Campeón and Gardner-near-Floreana. The Floreana mockingbird is also known as Darwin's mockingbird, as it was the arguable inspiration for Charles Darwin's work on the origins of species; he noticed distinct differences between them and previous species he had encountered and consequently established the existence of other variants on neighboring islands.

== Taxonomy and systematics ==
The Floreana mockingbird, Galapagos mockingbird (Mimus parvulus), Espanola mockingbird (M. macdonaldi), and San Cristobal mockingbird (M. melanotis) were previously placed in genus Nesomimus and were considered conspecific. They now form a superspecies. The Floreana mockingbird is monotypic.

== Description ==
The Floreana mockingbird is 25 to 26 cm (9.8 to 10.2 in) long. Males weigh an average of 65.7 g (2.32 oz) and females 59.8 g (2.11 oz). Adults have a pied appearance. They have a pale supercilium, a black patch in front of the eye, a darkish one below it, and white cheeks. Their crown, upperparts, and tail are grayish brown with a few faint darker streaks. Their whitish underparts have a dark patch on the side of the breast and faint spots on the breast and flanks. The folded wing shows two white bars. The juvenile is similar to the adult but more heavily streaked.

== Distribution and habitat ==
The Floreana mockingbird was formerly abundant on Floreana Island but had been extirpated from there by 1888. It now occurs only on two islets off Floreana's shore, Campeón and Gardner-near-Floreana. The islets provide a habitat of low vegetation along their shores and arid scrub with cacti and a few trees inland.

== Behavior ==
=== Feeding ===
The Floreana mockingbird mostly forages on the ground, but also in vegetation. It is primarily insectivorous but also eats cactus fruit, carrion, and probably seabird eggs.

=== Breeding ===
The Floreana mockingbird's breeding season spans from October to April and two broods are usual. It is a cooperative breeder with up to five adults in each territory of about 2 ha (4.9 acres). The nest is a cup made of twigs lined with finer material; it is almost always placed in a cactus. The clutch size is two to four.

=== Vocalization ===
The Floreana mockingbird has a "[l]oud, melodious song [and] does not mimic other species."

== Status ==
The IUCN in 1994 initially assessed the Floreana mockingbird as Endangered. In 2008 it was reclassified as Critically Endangered but then in 2017 returned to Endangered status. It was extirpated from Floreana by 1888; introduced rats, mice, cats, dogs, and goats have all been implicated as causes. The population on the two islets has fluctuated with the presence or absence of El Niño events but is believed to exceed 250 individuals and be stable.

== Repopulation efforts ==
Studies are under way to attempt to reintroduce the Floreana mockingbird to the main island. These include assessments of Floreana's habitat and the status of the introduced predators and competitors.
