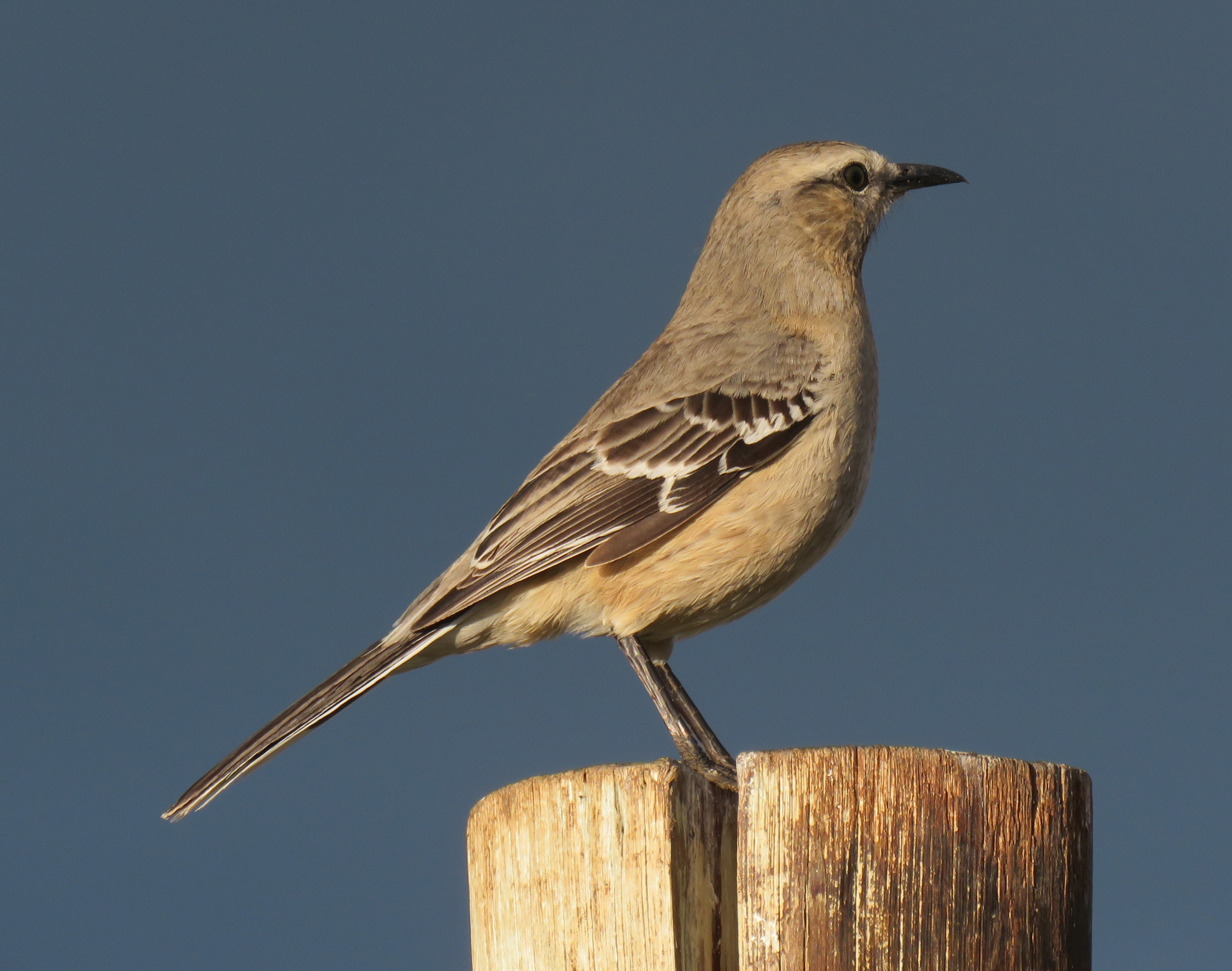

Conservation status
- Least Concern (IUCN 3.1)

Scientific classification
- Kingdom: Animalia
- Phylum: Chordata
- Class: Aves
- Order: Passeriformes
- Family: Mimidae
- Genus: Mimus
- Species: M. patagonicus

Binomial name
- Mimus patagonicus (Lafresnaye & D'Orbigny, 1837)

= Patagonian mockingbird =

Species of bird

The Patagonian mockingbird (Mimus patagonicus) is a species of bird in the family Mimidae. It is found in much of Argentina and locally in Chile.

== Taxonomy and systematics ==
The Clements taxonomy and BirdLife International consider the Patagonian mockingbird to be a sister species to the Chilean mockingbird (Mimus thenca). The International Ornithological Committee (IOC) does not treat them as that closely related. The Patagonian mockingbird is monotypic.

== Description ==
The Patagonian mockingbird is 22 to 25 cm (8.7 to 9.8 in) long. Males weigh 44.4 to 61.8 g (1.57 to 2.18 oz) and females 43.8 to 65.4 g (1.54 to 2.31 oz). Adults have a brown crown, a whitish supercilium, and a blackish line through the eye. Their upperparts are plain grayish brown that is paler on the rump. The wings are blackish and show two thin pale bars when folded. Their tail is blackish except for the white outer edge of the outermost feathers and white tips on the others. They are buffy gray below that is paler on the throat and belly. The juvenile is essentially the same with the addition of blackish spots on the breast.

== Distribution and habitat ==
The Patagonian mockingbird is a year round resident of northwestern and central Argentina. It breeds in southern Argentina and southern Chile as far as the Strait of Magellan and in the non-breeding season migrates north to central and somewhat into northeastern Argentina. It is a casual visitor to Tierra del Fuego and has been recorded in the Falkland Islands.

The Patagonian mockingbird generally inhabits open shrublands and bushlands including the Patagonian steppe. In southeastern Argentina, it is also found in somewhat open woodland. In elevation it ranges from sea level to 1,800 m (5,900 ft).

== Behavior ==
=== Feeding ===
The Patagonian mockingbird feeds mostly on the ground. In the breeding season its primary diet is insects and it adds fruits and berries in the non-breeding season.

=== Breeding ===
The Patagonian mockingbird breeds in January in northern Argentina and between October and December in Chile. It is monogamous and appears to be territorial. Family groups stay together in the non-breeding season. Its nest is an open cup made of twigs and lined with softer materials and is placed low in vegetation. The clutch size varies from three to six.

=== Vocalization ===
The Patagonian mockingbird sings continuously for long periods from an open perch or from within vegetation, "a warbling series of varied notes and phrases". It mimics other species.

== Status ==
The IUCN has assessed the Patagonian mockingbird as being of Least Concern. It is fairly common except in Chile and there are no known threats to its population.
