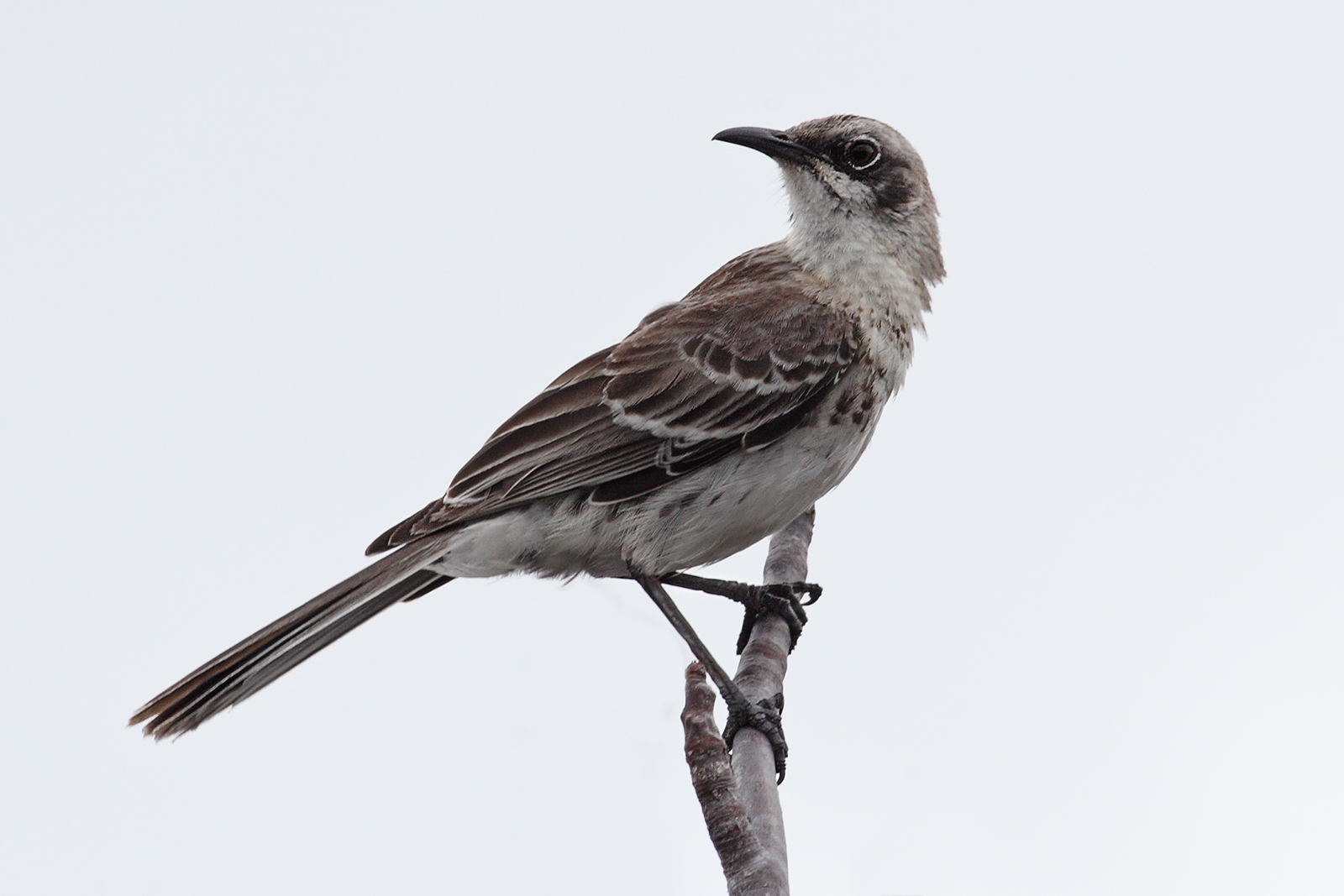

Conservation status
- Near Threatened (IUCN 3.1)

Scientific classification
- Kingdom: Animalia
- Phylum: Chordata
- Class: Aves
- Order: Passeriformes
- Family: Mimidae
- Genus: Mimus
- Species: M. melanotis

Binomial name
- Mimus melanotis (Gould, 1837)

Synonyms
- Nesomimus melanotis

= San Cristóbal mockingbird =

Species of bird

The San Cristóbal mockingbird (Mimus melanotis) or Chatham mockingbird, is a species of bird in the family Mimidae. It is endemic to San Cristóbal Island in the Galápagos Islands.

== Taxonomy and systematics ==
The San Cristóbal mockingbird, Galápagos mockingbird (Mimus parvulus), Espanola mockingbird (M. macdonaldi), and Floreana mockingbird (M. trifasciatus) were previously placed in genus Nesomimus and were considered conspecific. They now form a superspecies. The San Cristóbal mockingbird is monotypic.

== Description ==
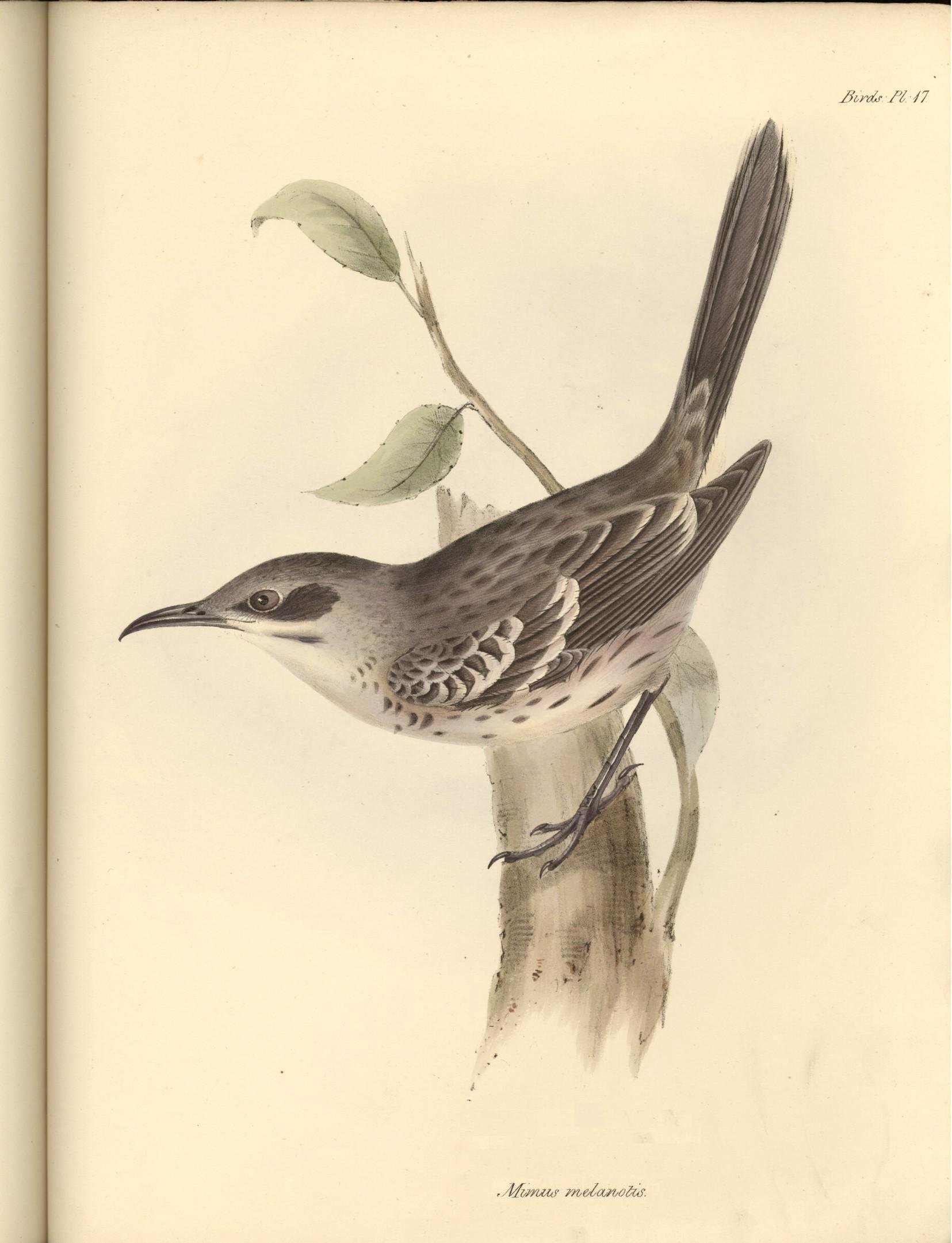
Illustration by John Gould (1839)

The San Cristóbal mockingbird is 25 to 26 cm (9.8 to 10.2 in) long. Males weigh an average of 53.2 g (1.88 oz) and females 48 g (1.7 oz). Adults have a thin white supercilium, black lores, and a blackish patch behind the eye. Their crown and upperparts are grayish brown with some darker streaks. The wings and tail are dark brown; the wings when folded show two whitish bars and the outer tail feathers have whitish tips. They are mostly whitish below, with a buffy tinge on the throat, tiny dark spots on the sides of the breast, and blackish brown streaks on the flanks. The juvenile is similar to the adults but with more streaking on its underparts.

== Distribution and habitat ==
The San Cristóbal mockingbird is found only on San Cristóbal Island in the eastern Galápagos. It inhabits several landscapes across all elevations of the island including coastal mangroves, open arid lowland scrub, scrubby woodland with scattered trees and cacti, and some taller woodlands. It shuns dense lowland forest, tall wet woodland, and grassland.

== Behavior ==
=== Feeding ===
The San Cristóbal mockingbird mostly forages on the ground for terrestrial arthropods but also takes fruits and berries from low vegetation. It has been documented taking ticks from marine iguanas.

=== Display ===
Although the San Cristóbal mockingbird does not have white wing patches, it does a "wing flash" movement similar to that done by Mimus mockingbirds that do have such patches. It runs a short distance, briefly opens its wings to two-thirds of full extension, then extends them fully to a position just above horizontal.

=== Breeding ===
The San Cristóbal mockingbird nests from January to April at low elevations and to later at higher ones. Its year round territory is typically 3 to 5 ha (7.4 to 12.4 acres). The species builds a bulky nest of twigs lined with grasses in the crotch of a tree, usually 4 to 5 m (13 to 16 ft) above the ground. The clutch size is two to five, though usually four. The female incubates the eggs and both parents feed nestlings.

=== Vocalization ===
The San Cristbal mockingbird sings a "[l]oud, melodious and disjointed territorial song typical of [its] genus."

== Status ==
The IUCN has assessed the San Cristóbal mockingbird as Near Threatened. Prior to 2020 it was classified as Endangered. "The population is moderately small, but stable and currently not under imminent threat." The population is estimated to be at least 20,000 mature individuals.

== See also ==
- Galápagos mockingbird
- Floreana mockingbird
- Española mockingbird
