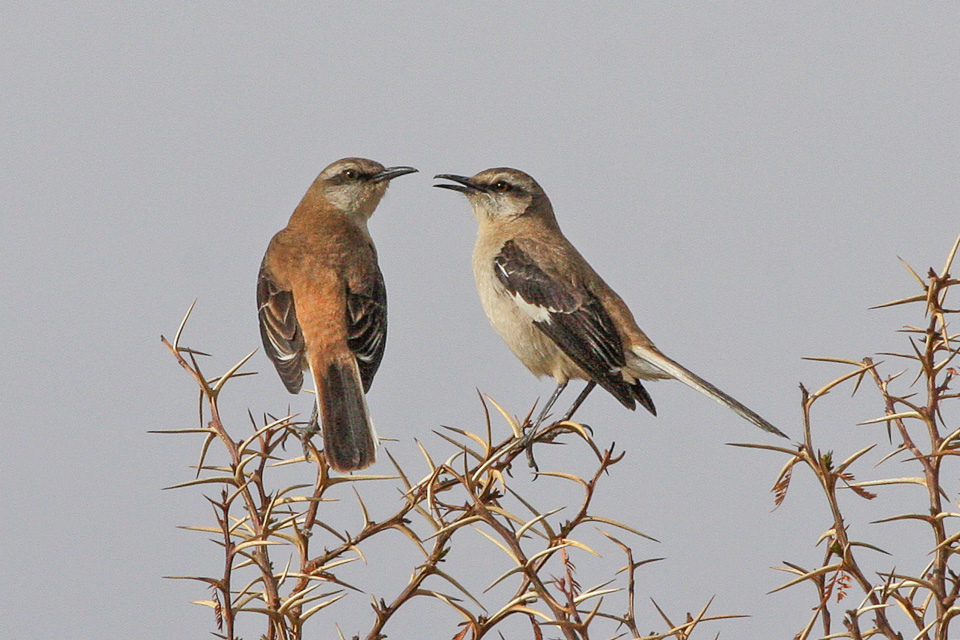
- Two in Argentina

Conservation status
- Least Concern (IUCN 3.1)

Scientific classification
- Kingdom: Animalia
- Phylum: Chordata
- Class: Aves
- Order: Passeriformes
- Family: Mimidae
- Genus: Mimus
- Species: M. dorsalis

Binomial name
- Mimus dorsalis (Lafresnaye & D'Orbigny, 1837)

= Brown-backed mockingbird =

Species of bird

The brown-backed mockingbird (Mimus dorsalis) is a species of bird in the family Mimidae. It is found in Argentina and Bolivia.

== Taxonomy and systematics ==
The brown-backed mockingbird is a sister species to the white-banded mockingbird (Mimus triurus). It is monotypic.

== Description ==
The brown-backed mockingbird is 21 to 25.5 cm (8.3 to 10.0 in) long and weighs between 52 and 65 g (1.8 and 2.3 oz) with an average of 58.7 g (2.07 oz). The adult has a well-defined whitish supercilium, a black line through the eye, and dusky cheeks. Its crown and upperparts are chestnut brown that is brightest on the rump. The crown has darker streaks. Most of the tail is blackish but the outer three to four feathers are white. Its underside is whitish with a buff tinge to the chest, sides and flanks. The juvenile is similar with the addition of dusky spotting on its breast.

== Distribution and habitat ==
Most of the brown-backed mockingbird's range is in western and southern Bolivia, from La Paz Department south. It also entends into northwestern Argentina as far south as Tucumán Province.

The brown-backed mockingbird inhabits arid landscapes of brush, desert shrubs, and hedgerows, often near human habitation. In elevation it mostly occurs between 2,300 and 3,500 m (7,500 and 11,500 ft) but can be found as low as 1,700 m (5,600 ft) and as high as 4,200 m (13,800 ft).

== Behavior ==
=== Feeding ===
The brown-backed mockingbird forages mostly on the ground, but details of its feeding behavior and diet have not been published.

=== Breeding ===
The brown-backed mockingbird breeds from November to March. It constructs a cup nest of twigs, often in cactus and sometimes in a bush. The clutch is four eggs. Essentially nothing else is known about its breeding phenology

=== Vocalization ===
The brown-backed mockingbird's song is "a series of repeated harsh notes and chuckles".

== Status ==
The IUCN has assessed the brown-backed mockingbird as being of Least Concern. It is not a well-studied species, but appears to be common in suitable habitat and there are no known threats to the population.
