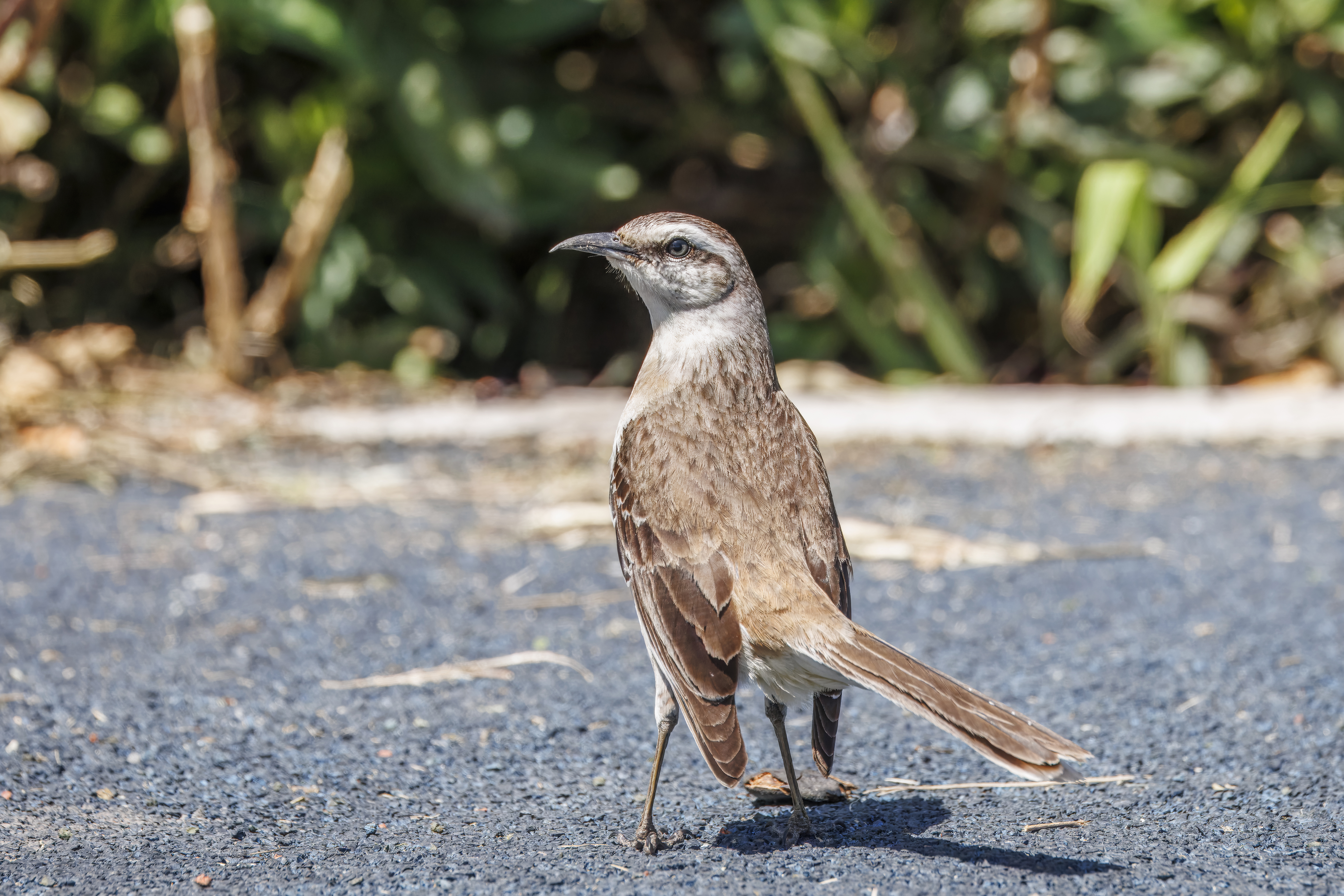
- in Buenos Aires, Argentina

Conservation status
- Least Concern (IUCN 3.1)

Scientific classification
- Kingdom: Animalia
- Phylum: Chordata
- Class: Aves
- Order: Passeriformes
- Family: Mimidae
- Genus: Mimus
- Species: M. saturninus

Binomial name
- Mimus saturninus (Lichtenstein, MHC, 1823)

= Chalk-browed mockingbird =

Species of bird

The chalk-browed mockingbird (Mimus saturninus) is a bird in the family Mimidae. It is found in Brazil, Bolivia, Argentina, Paraguay, Suriname, and Uruguay.

== Taxonomy and systematics ==
The chalk-browed mockingbird has four subspecies: the nominate Mimus saturninus saturninus, M. s. arenaceus, M. s. frater, and M. s. modulator.

== Description ==
The chalk-browed mockingbird is 23.5 to 26 cm (9.3 to 10.2 in) long and weighs 55 to 73 g (1.9 to 2.6 oz). Males are slightly larger than females. Adults of the nominate subspecies have a dark brown crown, a broad white supercilium, a blackish line through the eye, and white cheeks. Their upperparts are brownish with some darker streaks; the rump is buffier. Their wings are blackish and show two obscure bars when folded. The tail is also blackish; most feathers have white tips and the outermost have white edges. The underside of their body is white from the throat to the vent, though the breast has a gray tinge and the flanks are buffy with faint dark streaks. The juvenile is browner than the adult and has buffier underparts with dark streaks on the breast.

M. s. frater is browner than the nominate, including the rump that is not buffy like the nominate's. M. s. arenaceus is essentially the same as frater but has a larger bill. M. s. modulator has some blackish brown spotting on its crown and back, lacks the gray tinge on the breast, and the flanks are paler and often unstreaked.

== Distribution and habitat ==
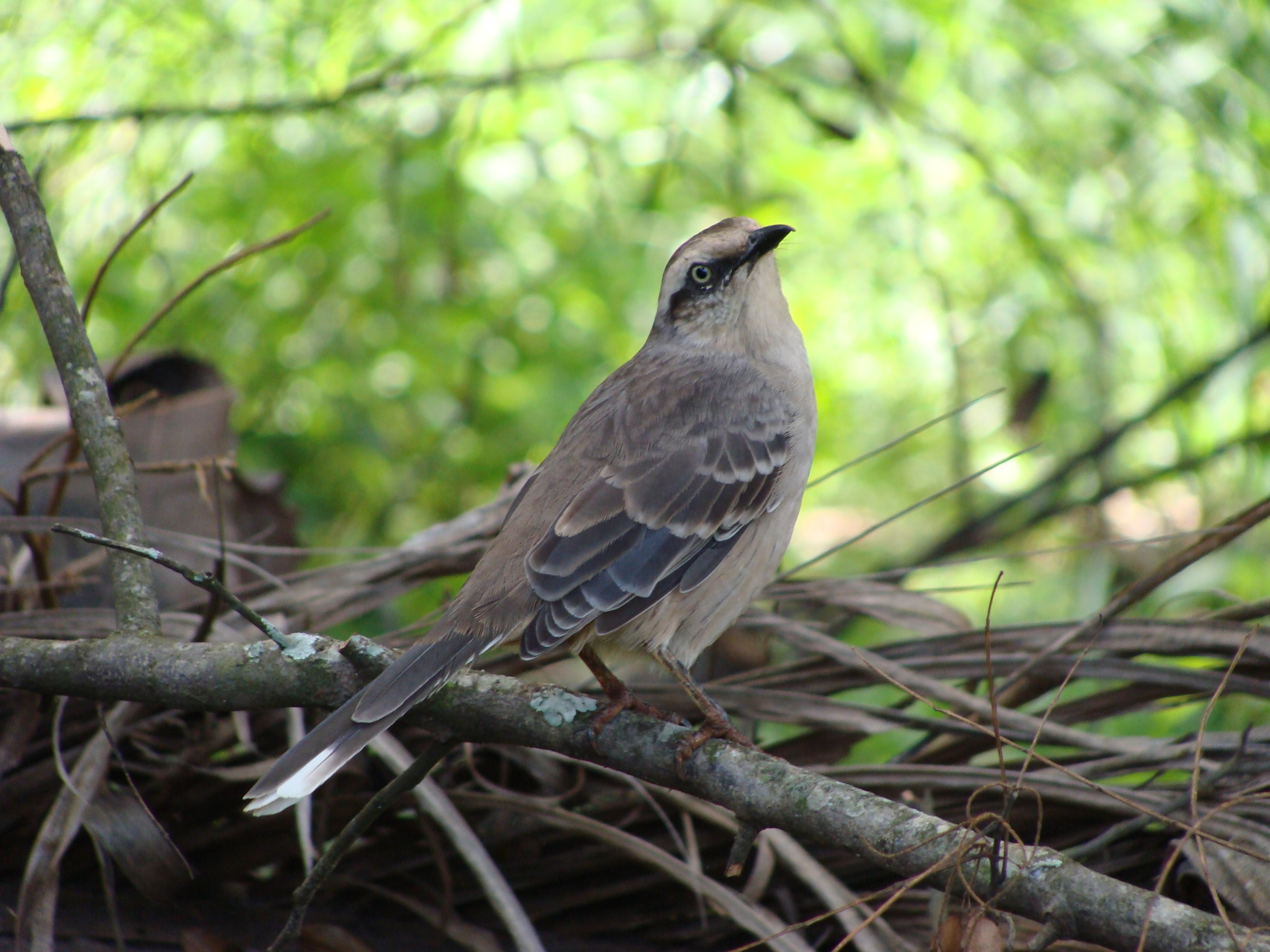
A chalk-browed mockingbird at the University of São Paulo, Ribeirão Preto campus, Brazil

The nominate subspecies of chalk-browed mockingbird is found in southern Suriname and adjoining Pará state in Brazil. M. s. arenaceus is found in eastern Brazil from Paraíba state south to eastern Bahia state. M. s. frater is found in central and eastern Bolivia and much of central Brazil. M. s. modulator is found from southeastern Bolivia and Paraguay into central Argentina and extreme southeastern Brazil.

The chalk-browed mockingbird inhabits open areas such as savannas, forest edges, open woodland, pastures with scattered trees, and urban and suburban gardens. It is generally a bird of the lowlands but reaches as high as about 2,500 m (8,200 ft) in northern Argentina.

== Behavior ==
=== Feeding ===
The chalk-browed mockingbird is omnivorous; it feeds on fruits, seeds, berries, insects, and other small vertebrates. It occasionally predates the eggs and nestlings of other birds. It forages mostly on the ground.

=== Breeding ===
The chalk-browed mockingbird's breeding season spans from September to January. The species is territorial and monogamous, though both related and unrelated helpers have been documented to aid in territory defense and in caring for young. The nest is a shallow cup made of twigs lined with finer material. It is typically placed in a low tree or dense shrub within 3 m (9.8 ft) of the ground, though sometimes higher. The clutch size is three or four. Nests are often parasitized by the shiny cowbird (Molothrus bonariensis).

=== Vocalization ===
The chalk-browed mockingbird's song is loud, a "varied series of notes, trills, [and] phrases". Its calls include a "sharp and penetrating 'tshrip'" and a "snorting sha-sha-sha". It often mimics other species including some raptors.

== Status ==
The IUCN has assessed the chalk-browed mockingbird as being of Least Concern. It has a large range (estimated at 10,600,000 km^{2} (4,100,000 sq mi)), is very common throughout much of it, and the population is believed to be stable. It occurs in several protected areas. There are "[n]o perceived threats, although nesting losses due to cowbird parasitism are considerable."

== Gallery ==
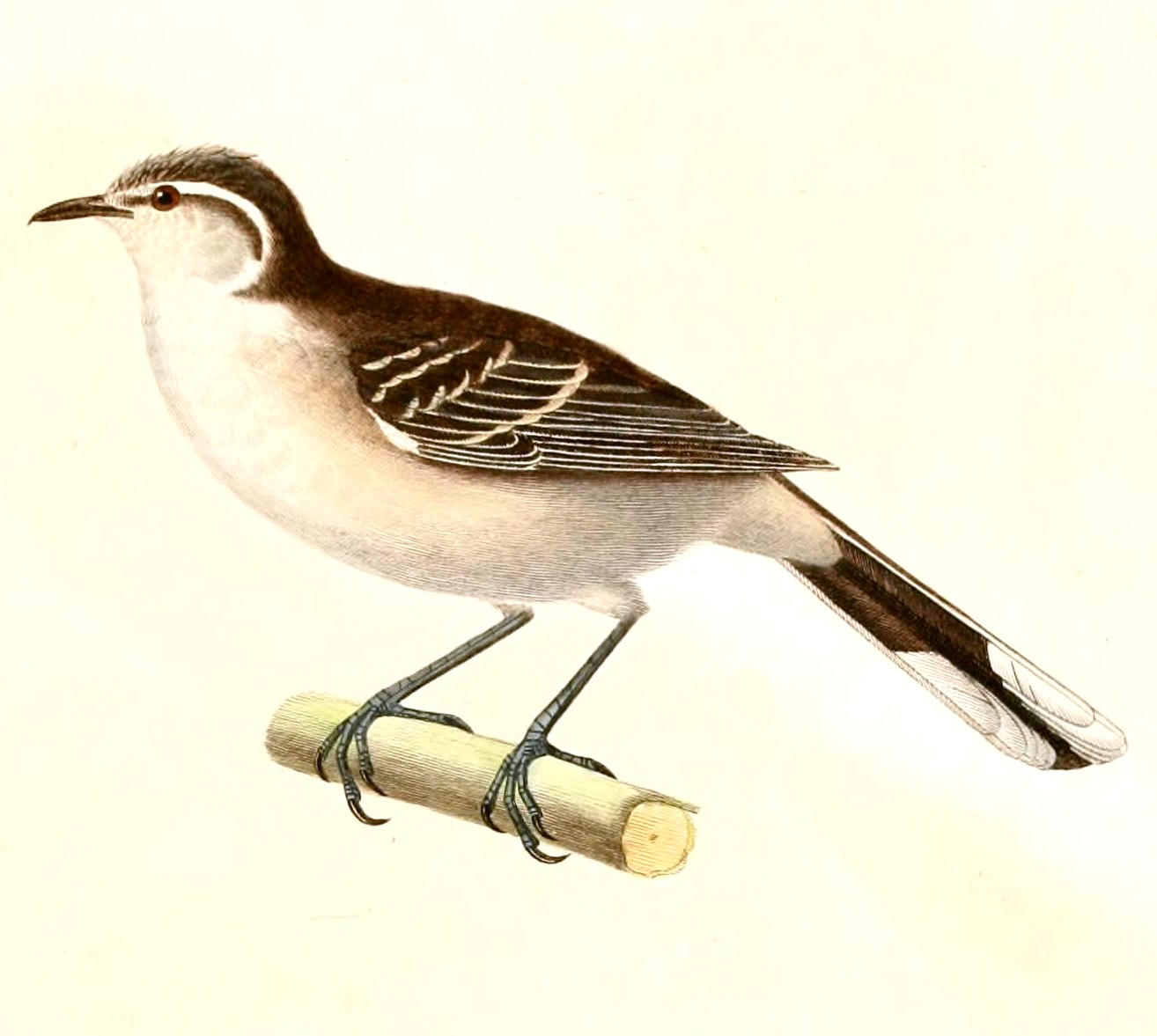
Painting from 1847

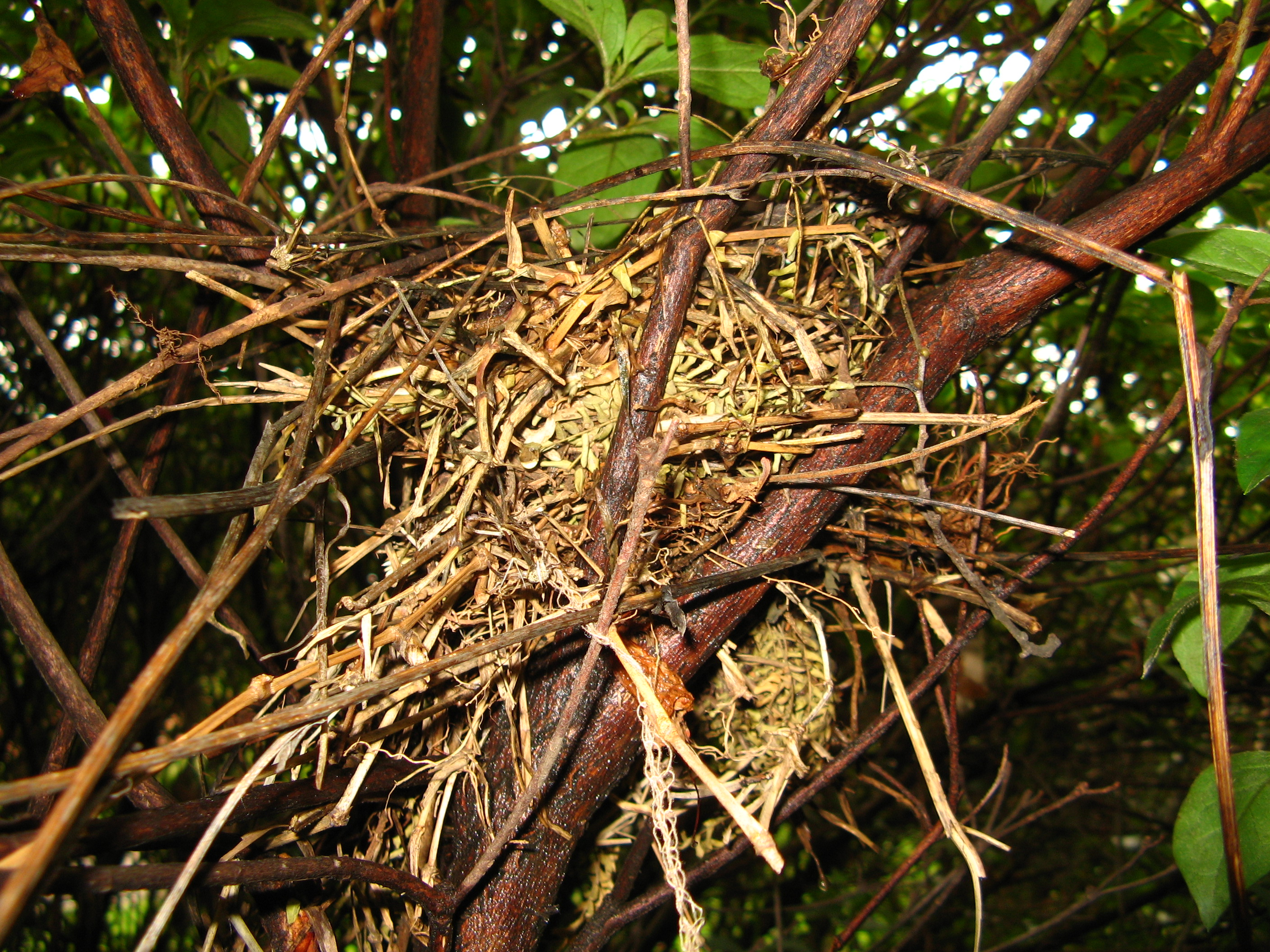
Nest

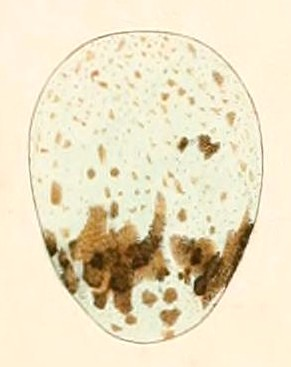
Egg

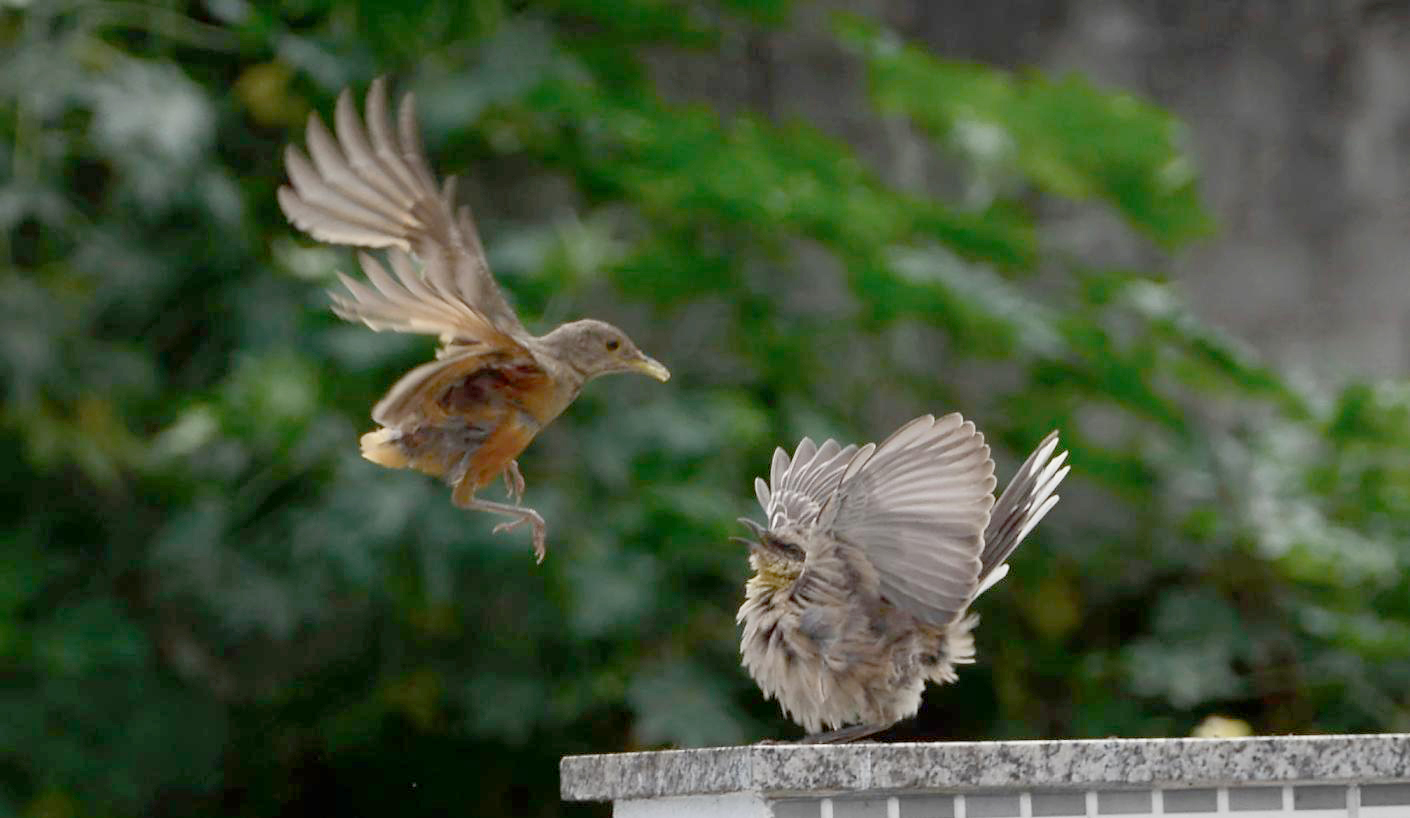

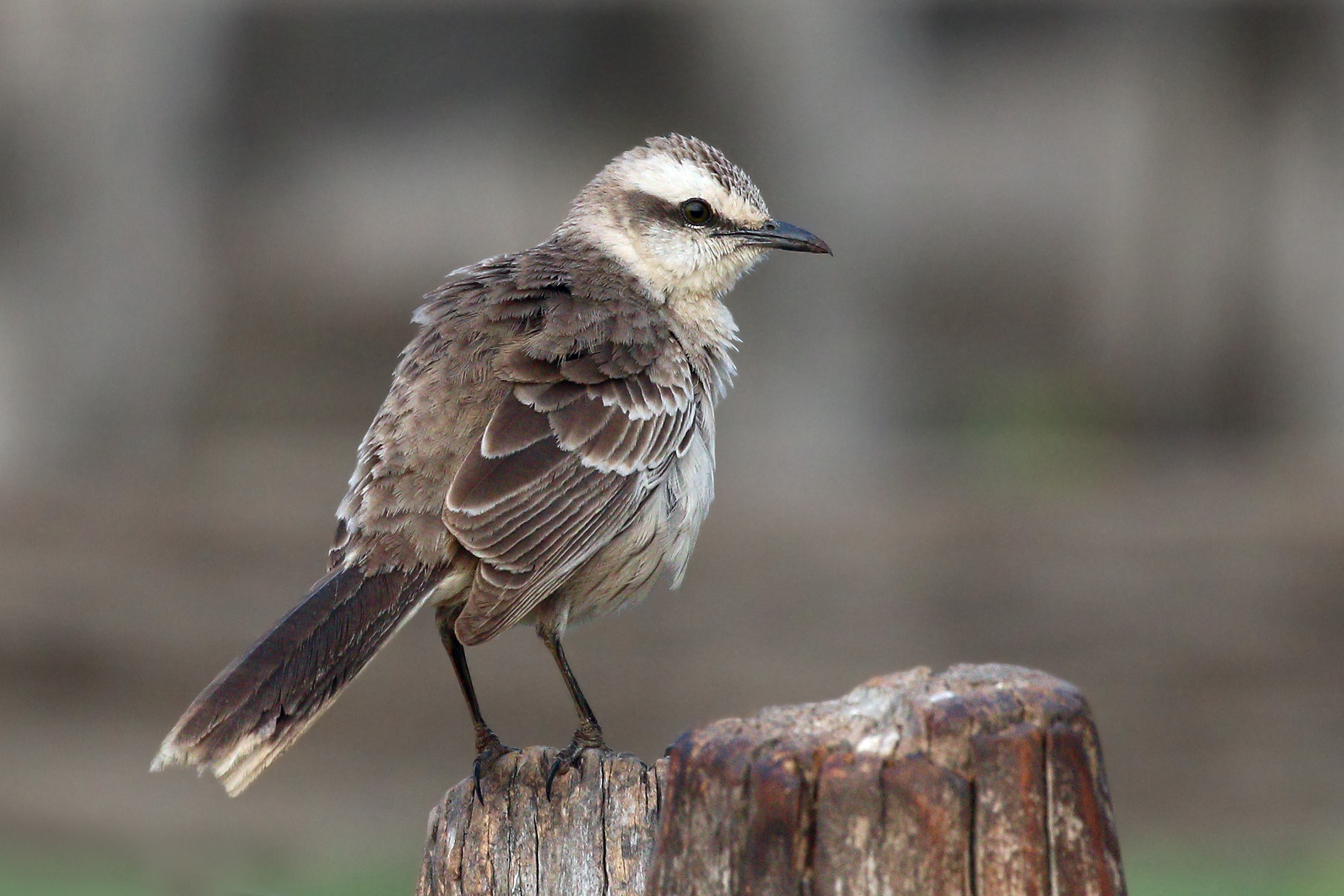
In the Pantanal, Brazil
