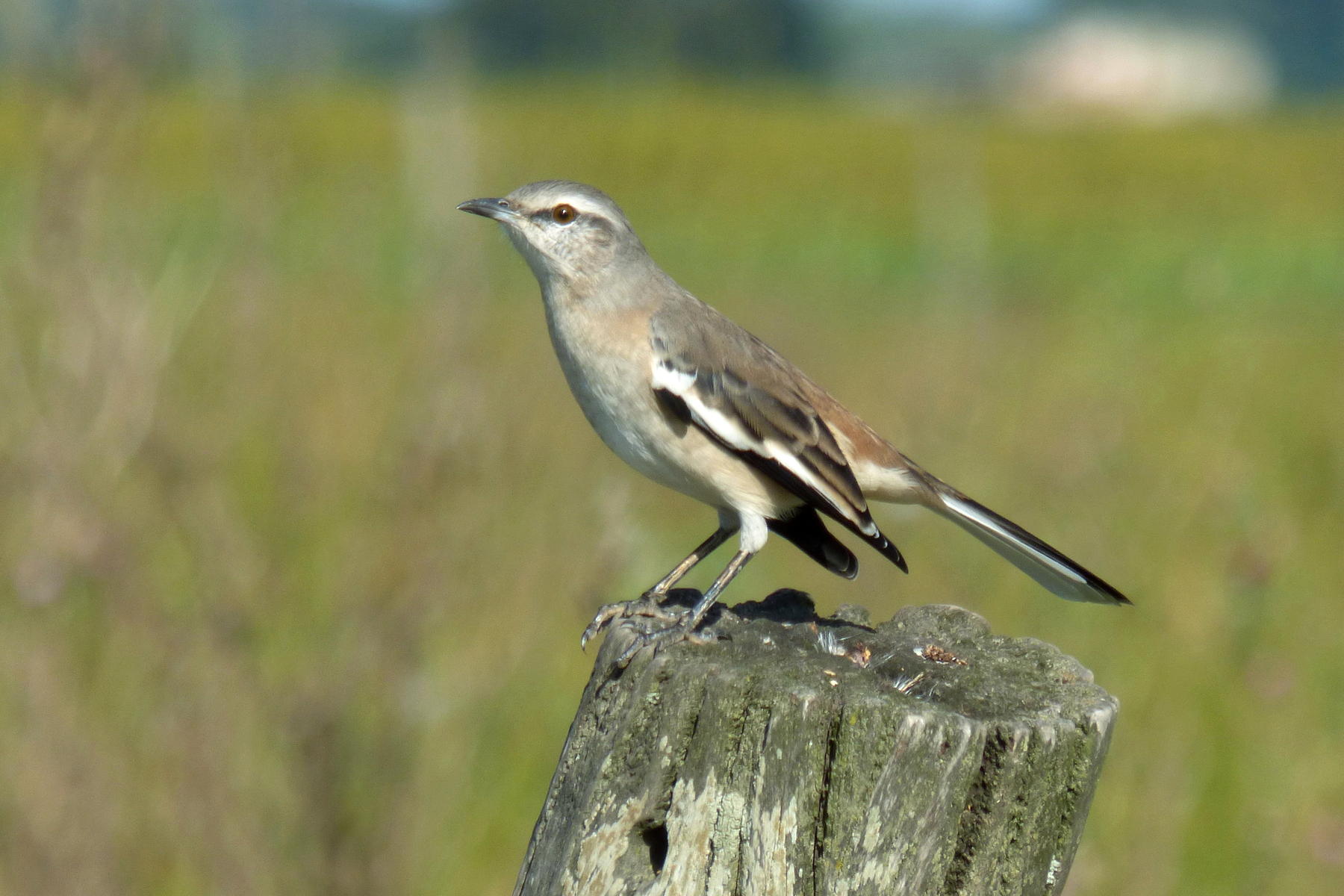
- In Las Colonias, Santa Fe, Argentina

Conservation status
- Least Concern (IUCN 3.1)

Scientific classification
- Kingdom: Animalia
- Phylum: Chordata
- Class: Aves
- Order: Passeriformes
- Family: Mimidae
- Genus: Mimus
- Species: M. triurus

Binomial name
- Mimus triurus (Vieillot, 1818)

= White-banded mockingbird =

Species of bird

The white-banded mockingbird (Mimus triurus) is a species of bird in the family Mimidae. It is found in Argentina, Bolivia, Brazil, Chile, Paraguay, and Uruguay.

== Taxonomy and systematics ==
The white-banded mockingbird and the brown-backed mockingbird (Mimus dorsalis) are sister species. Both are monotypic.

== Description ==
The white-banded mockingbird is 20 to 23.5 cm (7.9 to 9.3 in) long and weighs 49 to 54 g (1.7 to 1.9 oz). The male is slightly larger than the female. Adults have a grayish crown, a white supercilium, a blackish line through the eye, and speckled cheeks. Their upperparts are smoky gray blending to reddish cinnamon on the rump. The central third of the tail is black and the outer feathers white. The folded wing shows a broad white band; the rest of the wing is blackish. The white on the wings and tail are conspicuous in flight. The adults are mostly whitish below; the sides and flanks have a cinnamon wash and the vent area is buffy. The juvenile is similar but with a spotted breast and less white in the wing.

== Distribution and habitat ==
The white-banded mockingbird breeds primarily in central Argentina. In the non-breeding season it apparently withdraws from the southernmost part of its range and is also found in Bolivia, Brazil, Chile, Paraguay, and Uruguay. It is suspected to regularly breed in all of these countries except Brazil and Chile. Vagrants have been recorded in Peru and the Falkland Islands.

The white-banded mockingbird inhabits a variety of landscapes including low woodlands, savanna, open brushy country, steppe, and around human habitations. It is mostly found below 500 m (1,600 ft) of elevation but breeds as high as 2,600 m (8,500 ft) in northern Argentina and as a non-breeder reaches higher in Bolivia and Chile.

== Behavior ==
=== Feeding ===
The white-banded mockingbird is thought to be mostly insectivorous in the breeding season but almost nothing is known otherwise.

=== Breeding ===
The white-banded mockingbird's nest is an open bowl made of twigs lined with softer material. It is placed low in vegetation, often a thorny bush. It lays its clutch of four eggs (occasionally three) in November and December. Nests are frequently parasitized by the shiny cowbird (Molothrus bonariensis).

=== Vocalization ===
The white-banded mockingbird is a "[s]uperlative songster, the most outstanding of genus". Its song is " a long, loud and extended stream of melodic notes and phrases" and it is an excellent mimic.

== Status ==
The IUCN has assessed the white-banded mockingbird as being of Least Concern. It is fairly common to common in most of its range, though the widely scattered breeding records north of Argentina may indicate a more precarious situation there.

== Gallery ==
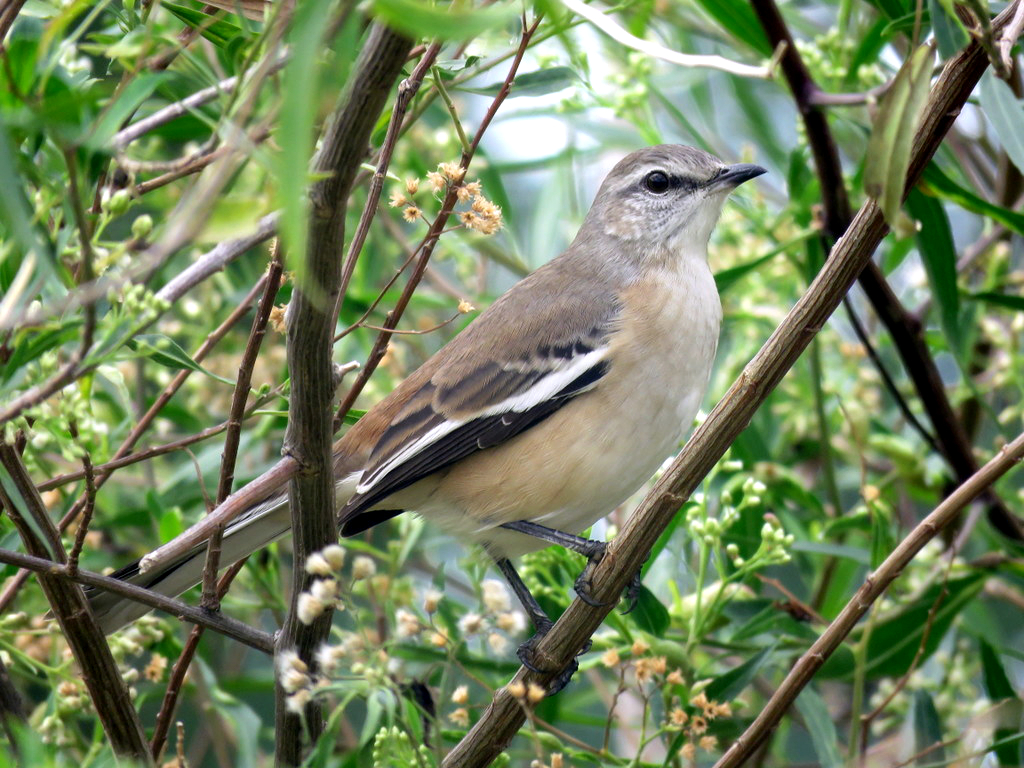
In Buenos Aires, Argentina

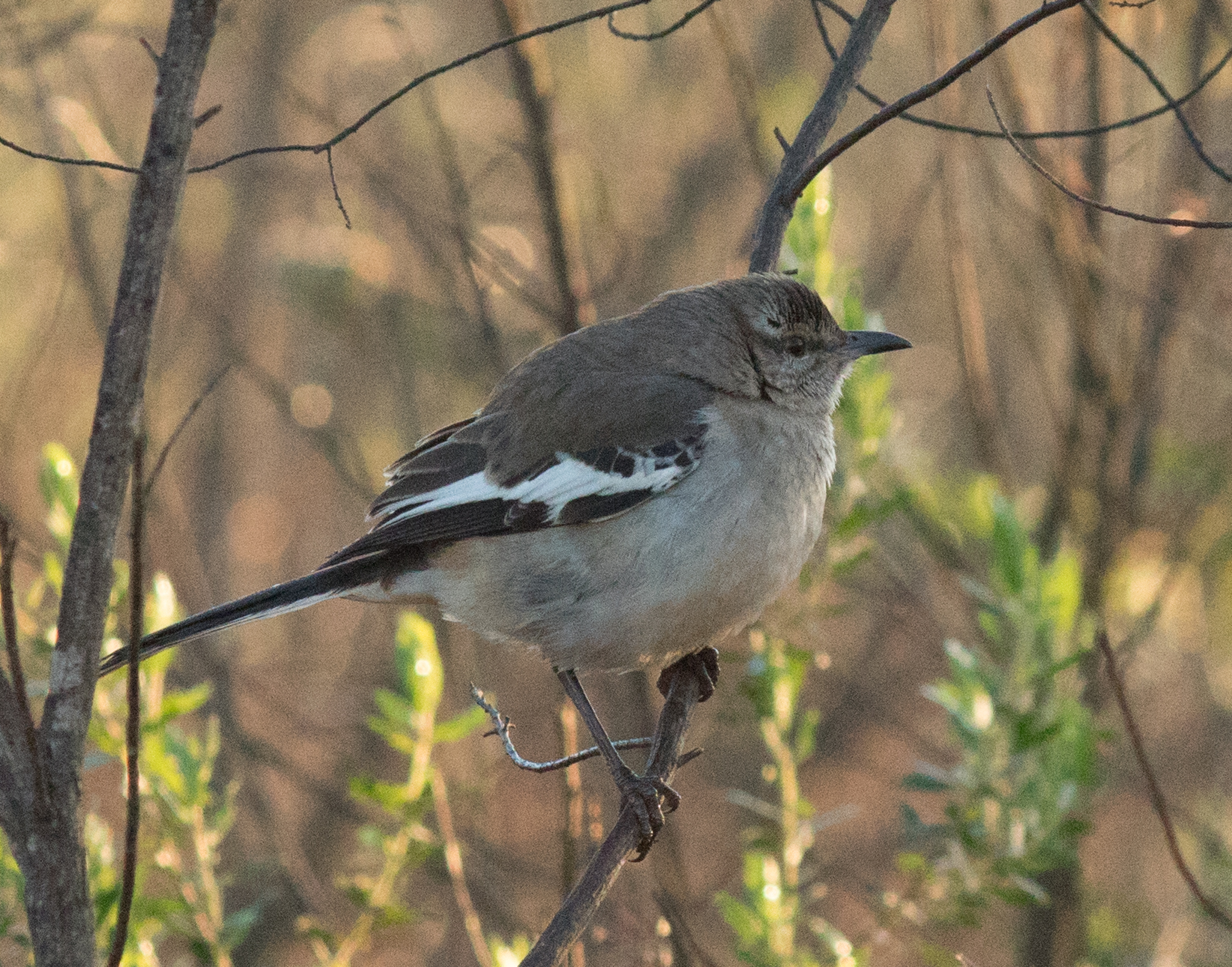
In Cruz Alta, Rio Grande do Sul, Brazil
