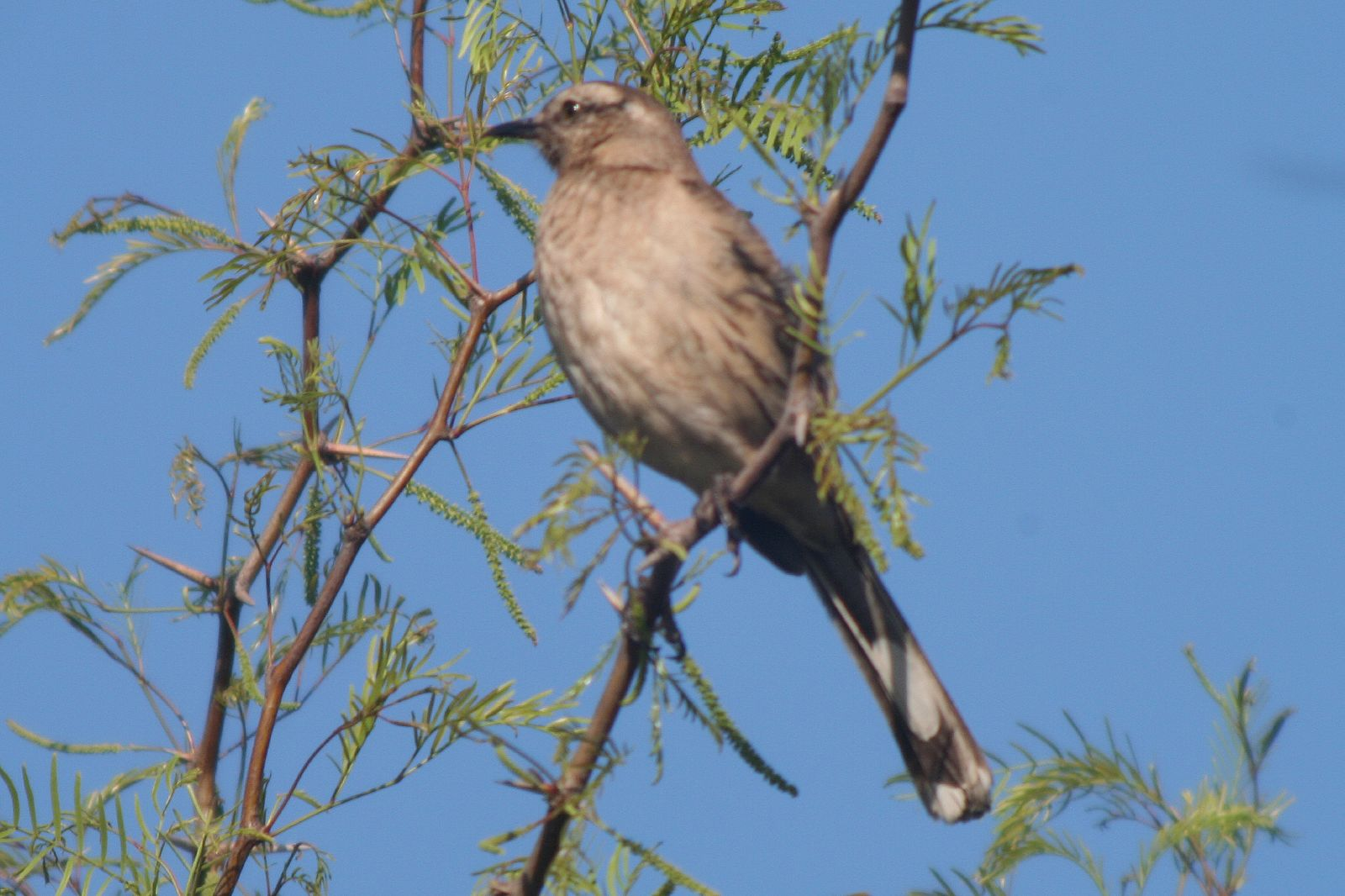
- Chilean mockingbird (M. thenca)

Scientific classification
- Kingdom: Animalia
- Phylum: Chordata
- Class: Aves
- Order: Passeriformes
- Family: Mimidae
- Genus: Mimus; F. Boie, 1826

Type species
- Mimus polyglottos Linnaeus, 1758

Species
- 14 recognized species, see text

Synonyms
- Nesomimus Ridgway, 1890; Orpheus Swainson, 1827

= Mimus =

Genus of birds

Mimus is a genus of passerine birds in the family Mimidae. It contains the typical mockingbirds.

== Taxonomy ==
The genus Mimus was introduced in 1826 by the German zoologist Friedrich Boie to contain a single species, Turdus polyglottis Linnaeus, 1758, the northern mockingbird, which becomes the type species by monotypy. The genus name is Latin for "mimic". A molecular phylogenetic study published in 2006 found that the genus Nesomimus, containing the species endemic to the Galápagos islands, was embedded in the genus Mimus. The genera were therefore merged under the earlier name, Mimus. The position of the Galápagos species within the genus Mimus was confirmed by a more comprehensive study published in 2012.

The genus contains the following 14 species, with four Nesomimus species endemic to the Galápagos Islands (given after the following 10):

Image	Scientific name	Common name
	Mimus dorsalis	Brown-backed mockingbird
	Mimus gundlachii	Bahama mockingbird
	Mimus longicaudatus	Long-tailed mockingbird
	Mimus patagonicus	Patagonian mockingbird
	Mimus thenca	Chilean mockingbird
	Mimus triurus	White-banded mockingbird
	Mimus polyglottos	Northern mockingbird
	Mimus graysoni	Socorro mockingbird
	Mimus gilvus	Tropical mockingbird
	Mimus saturninus	Chalk-browed mockingbird

The Nesomimus group includes the following four species endemic to the Galápagos Islands:

Image	Scientific name	Common name
	Mimus macdonaldi	Española mockingbird (formerly Hood mockingbird)
	Mimus parvulus	Galápagos mockingbird
	Mimus trifasciatus	Floreana mockingbird or Charles mockingbird
	Mimus melanotis	San Cristóbal mockingbird

The Nesomimus group is endemic to the Galápagos Islands. These mockingbirds were important in Charles Darwin's development of the theory of evolution by natural selection.

Previous to the merger between Nesomimus and Mimus scientists have proved in 1971 that both groups can produce hybrids. Robert I. Bowman and Anne Carter have studied a female Galápagos mockingbird and a male from the long-tailed mockingbird subspecies Mimus longicaudatus punensis that have interbred. They raised a hybrid offspring to adulthood.
