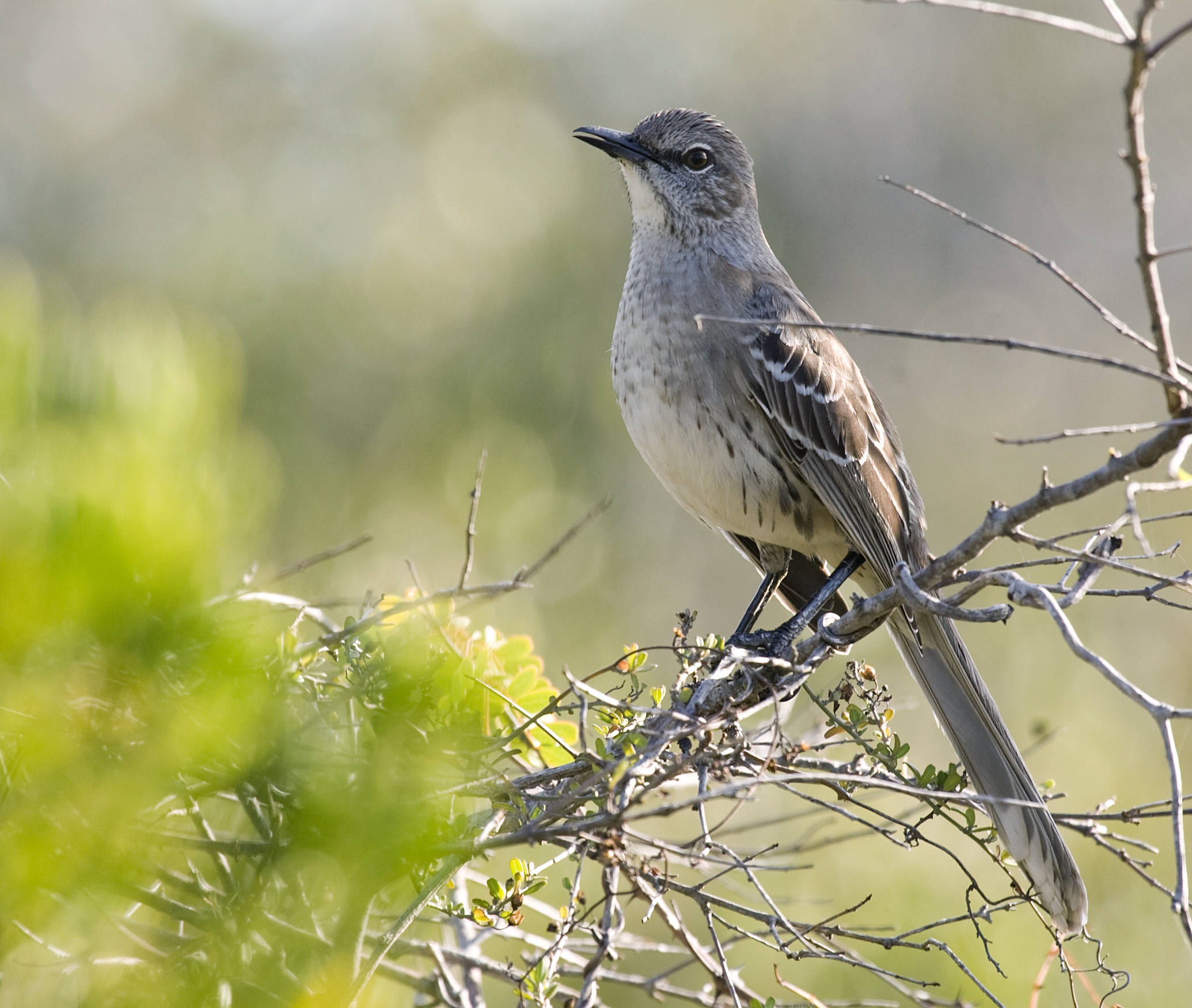
- In Ciego de Avila Province, Cuba

Conservation status
- Least Concern (IUCN 3.1)

Scientific classification
- Kingdom: Animalia
- Phylum: Chordata
- Class: Aves
- Order: Passeriformes
- Family: Mimidae
- Genus: Mimus
- Species: M. gundlachii

Binomial name
- Mimus gundlachii Cabanis, 1855

= Bahama mockingbird =

Species of bird

The Bahama mockingbird (Mimus gundlachii) is a species of bird in the family Mimidae. It is found in the Bahamas, Cuba, Jamaica and the Turks and Caicos Islands, and is a vagrant to Florida.

== Taxonomy and systematics ==
The Bahama mockingbird has two subspecies, the nominate Mimus gundlachii gundlachii and M. g. hillii. Its specific epithet honors Juan Gundlach.

== Description ==
The Bahama mockingbird is 28 cm (11 in) long and weighs between 57 and 85 g (2.0 and 3.0 oz) with an average of 66.8 g (2.36 oz). Adults of the nominate subspecies have a mottled face with a pale supercilium. Their upperparts are brownish gray with dark streaks from the crown to the lower back. Their outer tail feathers have whitish tips. Their underparts are light gray with light streaking on the upper breast and more prominent streaks on the flanks. The juvenile is similar but has more densely spotted underparts. M. g. hillii has more prominent streaking on its back than the nominate and the white tips on the tail feathers are larger.

== Distribution and habitat ==
The nominate subspecies of Bahama mockingbird is found in the Bahamas, the Turks and Caicos Islands, and the Sabana-Camagüey Archipelago off Cuba's north coast. M. g. hillii is found only in southern Jamaica.

Except in Jamaica, the Bahama mockingbird inhabits a variety of biomes including coastal strand, semi-arid scrub, open woodland, and plantations. In Jamaica it inhabits dry scrubby woodland on limestone hills. It appears to favor taller, denser vegetation than the similar northern mockingbird (Mimus polyglottus) where their ranges overlap.

== Behavior ==
=== Feeding ===
The Bahama mockingbird is omnivorous; its diet includes invertebrates, nectar, small fruits, and little lizards. It mainly forages on the ground, searching through leaf litter, but also hunts up to 6 m (20 ft) high in vegetation. It aggressively defends feeding sites.

=== Breeding ===
The Bahama mockingbird's breeding season spans from February to July in most areas but from April on the Cuban islands. Both sexes build a rough open cup nest of twigs, lined with softer fibers, and usually placed low in a bush. They aggressively defend their territory with vigorous song. The clutch size is two or three.

=== Vocalization ===
The Bahama mockingbird's song is loud and repetitive, a "series of abrupt, varied notes and phrases, with repetition". It apparently does not mimic other birds' songs.

== Status ==
The IUCN has assessed the Bahama mockingbird as being of Least Concern. It is common in the Bahamas, in southern Jamaica, and on some of the Cuban cays. As human habitation spreads it might suffer from competition with the northern mockingbird.
