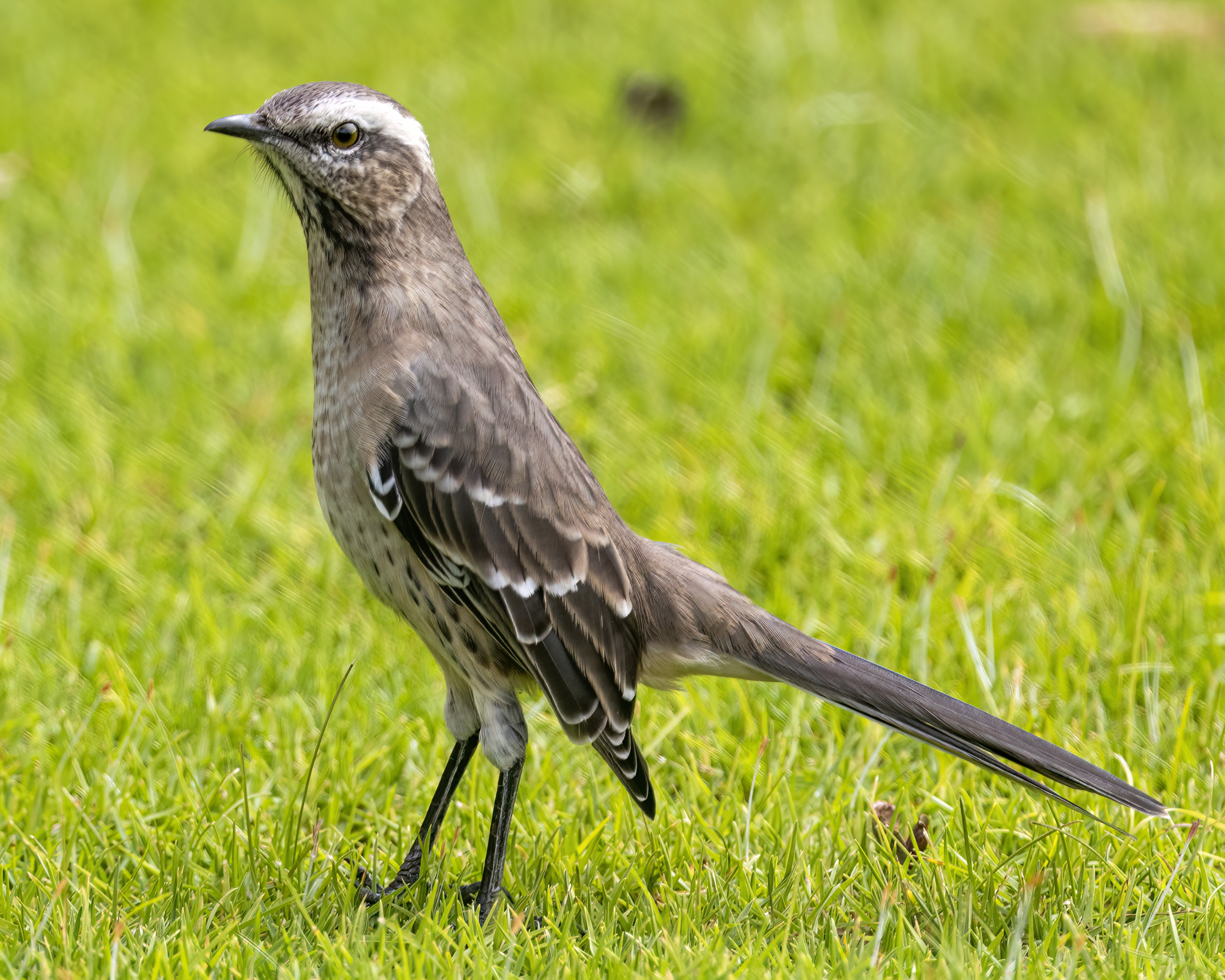

Conservation status
- Least Concern (IUCN 3.1)

Scientific classification
- Kingdom: Animalia
- Phylum: Chordata
- Class: Aves
- Order: Passeriformes
- Family: Mimidae
- Genus: Mimus
- Species: M. thenca

Binomial name
- Mimus thenca (Molina, 1782)

= Chilean mockingbird =

Tenca, Chilean mockingbird

Species of bird

The Chilean mockingbird (Mimus thenca), locally known as tenca, is a species of bird in the family Mimidae. It primarily inhabits Chile's northern half, though there are sightings in Argentina.

== Taxonomy and systematics ==
The Chilean mockingbird is monotypic.

== Description ==
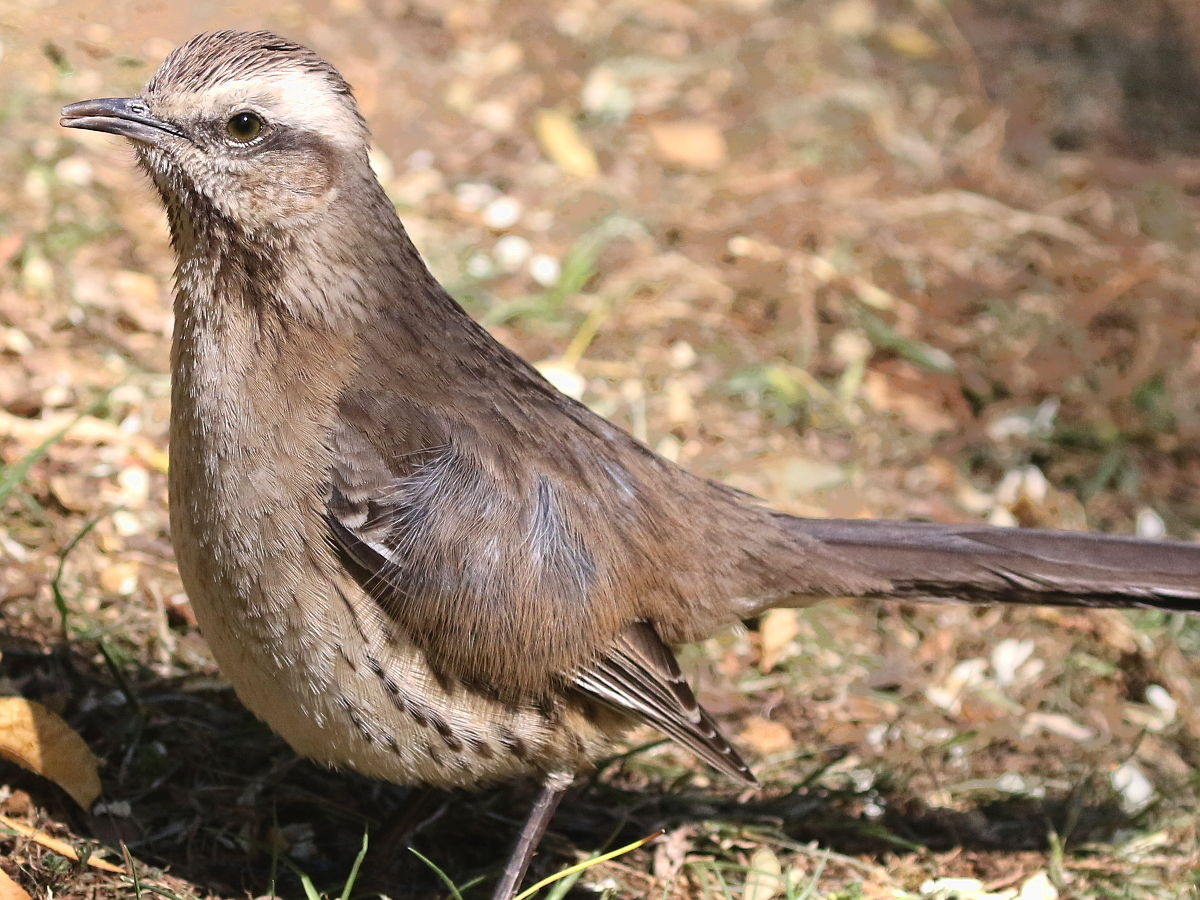
At Parque Juan Pablo II, Santiago, Chile

The Chilean mockingbird is 28 to 29 cm (11.0 to 11.4 in) long and weighs 66 g (2.3 oz). The male is somewhat larger than the female. Adults have a wide whitish supercilium. Their crown, neck, and back are brownish gray with darker streaks and their rump browner. The wings and tail are blackish. The wings show two narrow bars when folded. The outermost tail feathers have white edges and most of the others have white tips. The throat is whitish, the chest brownish gray, the belly dirty white, and the flanks buffy with blackish streaks. The juvenile is similar but more buffy below with more streaks.

== Distribution and habitat ==
The Chilean mockingbird is found in Chile from Copiapó Province in the Atacama Region south to Los Lagos, Puerto Montt, and Chiloé Island. A small population also exists in Neuquén Province, Argentina.

The Chilean mockingbird inhabits a wide variety of biomes, most of which are characterized by scrub, shrubs, or widely spaced trees. Examples include succulent coastal scrub, inland savanna bushland, and evergreen Chilean matorral. It also occurs at the edges of low relict woodland patches such as those in Bosque de Fray Jorge National Park and in disturbed habitats, though only rarely in urban areas. It shuns Nothofagus and Cryptocarya woodlands in the south and plantations of introduced pines in central Chile. In elevation it ranges from sea level to 2,200 m (7,200 ft).

== Behavior ==
=== Feeding ===
The Chilean mockingbird forages mainly on the ground, turning over leaf litter and digging under fallen branches and around plant stems. It also hunts in vegetation up to 3 m (9.8 ft) above ground. It is omnivorous; it has been documented feeding on insects, wild and cultivated fruits, nectar, and a small lizard.

=== Breeding ===
The Chilean mockingbird nests mainly in October and November. They are territorial, probably throughout the year. Their nest is a cup made of twigs lined with moss or wool, placed low in vegetion such as cacti and thorny bushes. The clutch size is two to four. The nest is often parasitized by shiny cowbirds (Molothrus bonariensis).

=== Vocalization ===
The Chilean mockingbird sings year round, "a series of sweet, variable notes and phrases". It is an "excellent mimic of other bird species".

== Status ==
The IUCN has assessed the Chilean mockingbird as being of Least Concern. Though it has a somewhat restricted range, it is common within it and there are no known threats to its population.
