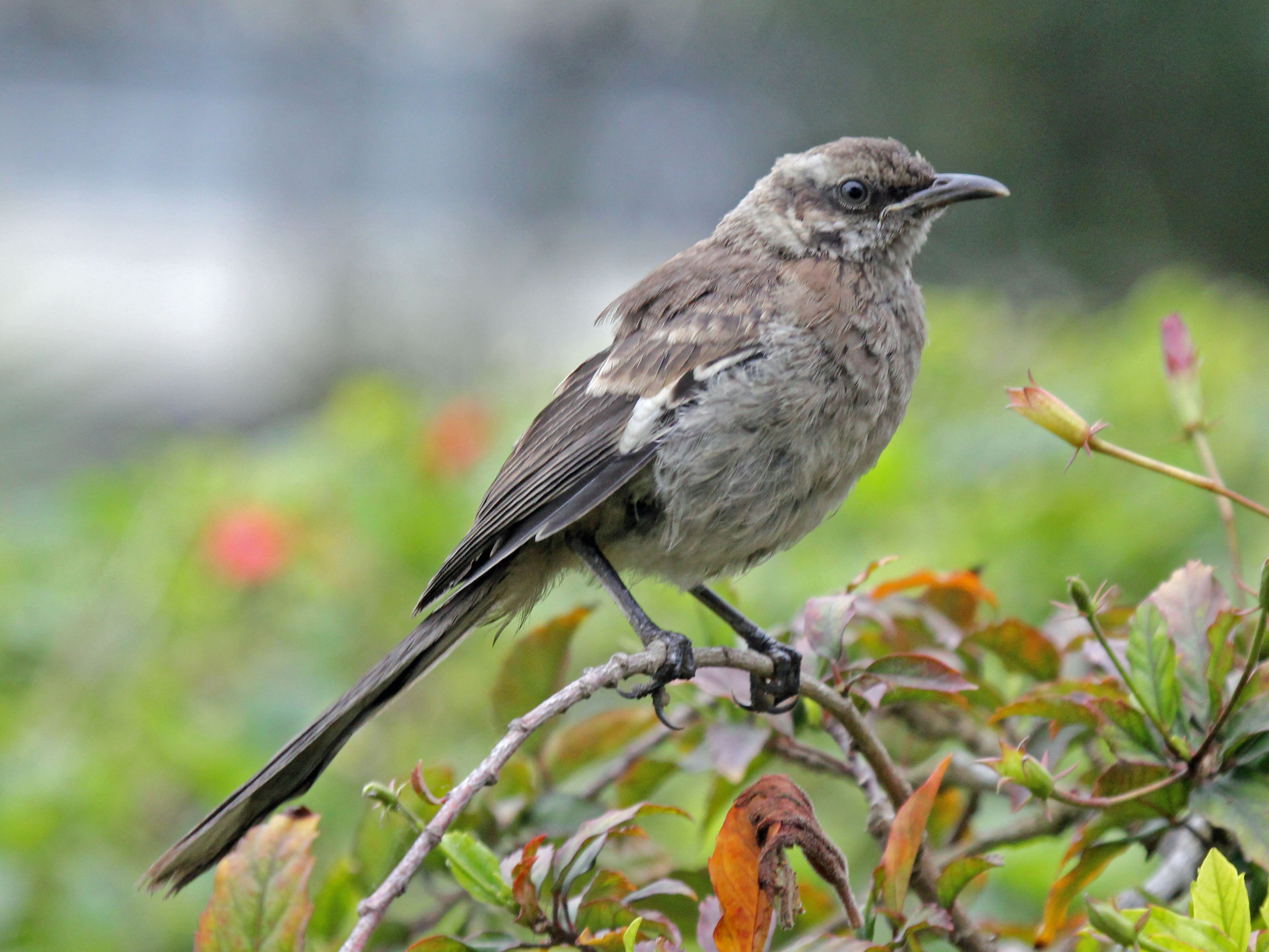

Conservation status
- Least Concern (IUCN 3.1)

Scientific classification
- Kingdom: Animalia
- Phylum: Chordata
- Class: Aves
- Order: Passeriformes
- Family: Mimidae
- Genus: Mimus
- Species: M. longicaudatus

Binomial name
- Mimus longicaudatus Tschudi, 1844

= Long-tailed mockingbird =

Species of bird

The long-tailed mockingbird (Mimus longicaudatus) is a species of bird in the family Mimidae. It is found in Ecuador and Peru.

== Taxonomy and systematics ==
The long-tailed mockingbird has four subspecies, the nominate Mimus longicaudatus longicaudatus, M. l. platensis, M. l. albogriseus, and M. l. maranonicus.

== Description ==
The long-tailed mockingbird is 27 to 29.5 cm (10.6 to 11.6 in) long and weighs 54 to 79 g (1.9 to 2.8 oz) with an average of 66.6 g (2.35 oz). Males are slightly larger than females. Adults of the nominate subspecies have a broad white supercilium and a black stripe through the eye that touches a black patch on the white cheek. Their crown and upperparts are brownish gray with darker streaks. The wings and long tail are mostly dusky brown, with patches of white that show conspicuously in flight. The throat, belly, and vent area are white and the breast and flanks buff to dull brown. Juveniles are similar to adults with the addition of streaks on the chest.

M. l. albogriseus is smaller and grayer than the nominate, and the white on its tail tips is more extensive. M. l. platensis is similar to albogriseus but closer to the nominate in size and has a longer bill. M. l. maranonicus is very similar to the nominate and may not truly be a separate subspecies from it.

== Distribution and habitat ==
The long-tailed mockingbird is found mostly along the Pacific coasts of Ecuador and Peru. The nominate M. l. longicaudatus inhabits most of the length of western Peru. M. l. albogriseus is in southwestern Ecuador, from central Manabí Province to Peru. M. l. platensis is found only on Isla de la Plata, about 30 km (19 mi) off the coast of Manabi. M. l. maranonicus is the anomaly; it is found inland along the upper Río Marañón in northwestern Peru.

The long-tailed mockingbird inhabits coastal desert scrub, arid woodland, and hedgerows and tree groves in agricultural areas. It is also found in gardens and parks. The coastal subspecies range from sea level to 1,900 m (6,200 ft), while M. l. maranonicus is found as high as 2,450 m (8,040 ft).

== Behavior ==
=== Feeding ===
The long-tailed mockingbird primarily forages on the ground and hops and glides between feeding sites. It is omnivorous, feeding on invertebrates (both terrestrial and marine), fruits, and berries. It occurs in loose groups in the non-breeding season.

=== Breeding ===
The long-tailed mockingbird nests from late December to July in southwestern Ecuador, where its breeding phenology has been most studied. The species is territorial but the previous brood's young may still be present. Its nest is a rough cup constructed of thorny twigs and lined with finer plant material and hair. It is typically placed in a spiny bush or cactus up to 5 m (16 ft) above ground but usually lower. The clutch size is three or four; the eggs are greenish with reddish brown spots and blotches. The nests are commonly parasitized by shiny cowbirds (Molothrus bonariensis).

=== Vocalization ===
The long-tailed mockingbird's song is "a fairly slow-paced series of variable rich whistled notes, churrs, rattles, squawks, and other noises, often with phrases repeated. Its calls are a throaty "garr!" and rapsing "gaawrr". It is not known to mimic other birds.

== Status ==
The IUCN has assessed the long-tailed mockingbird as being of Least Concern. The two mainland coastal subspecies are common but their distribution is patchy due to discontinuous habitat. The island home of M. l. platensis, though small, is partially protected by a national park. M. l. maranonicus also has a small range.

== Gallery ==
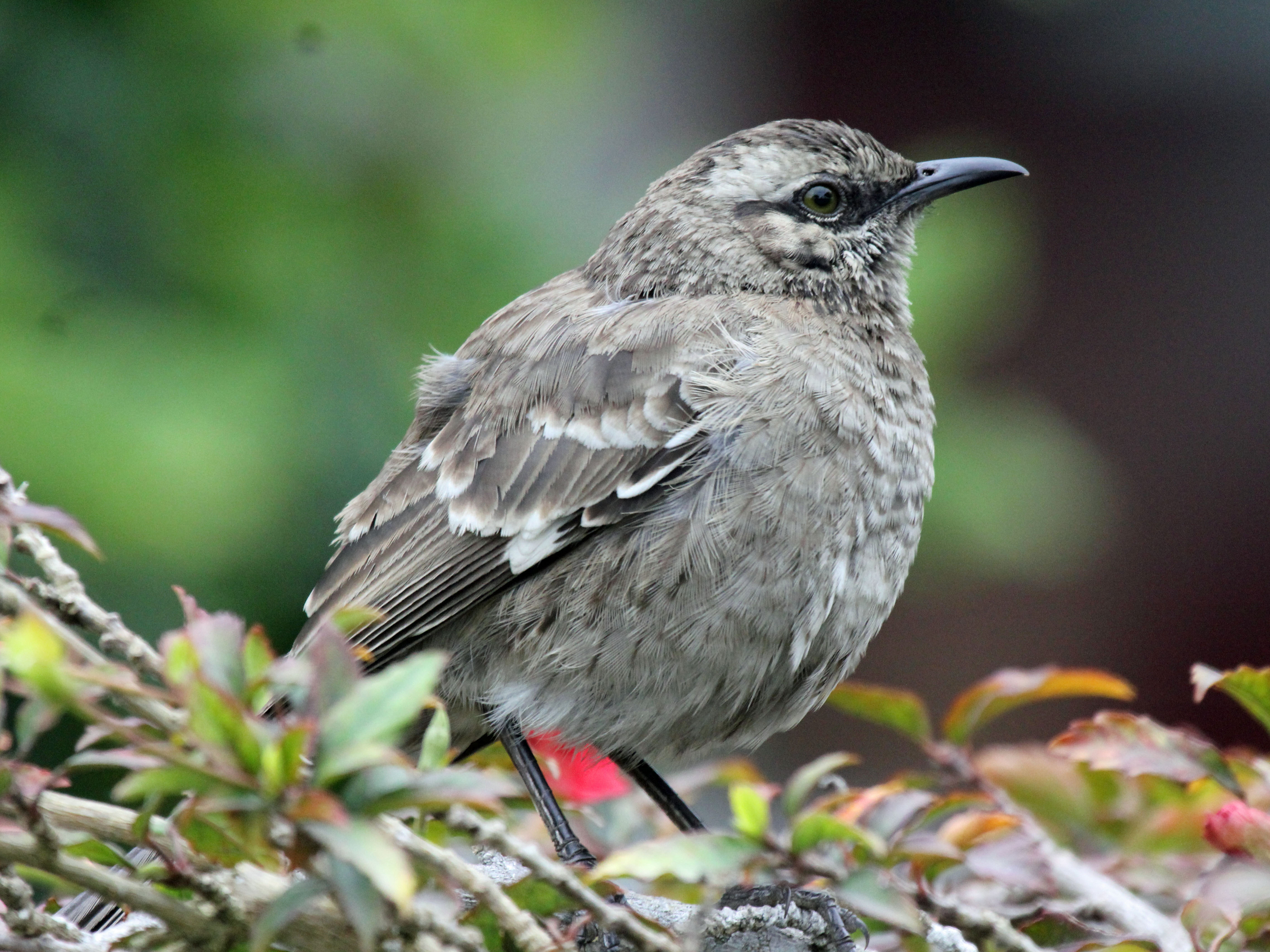
Lima, Peru

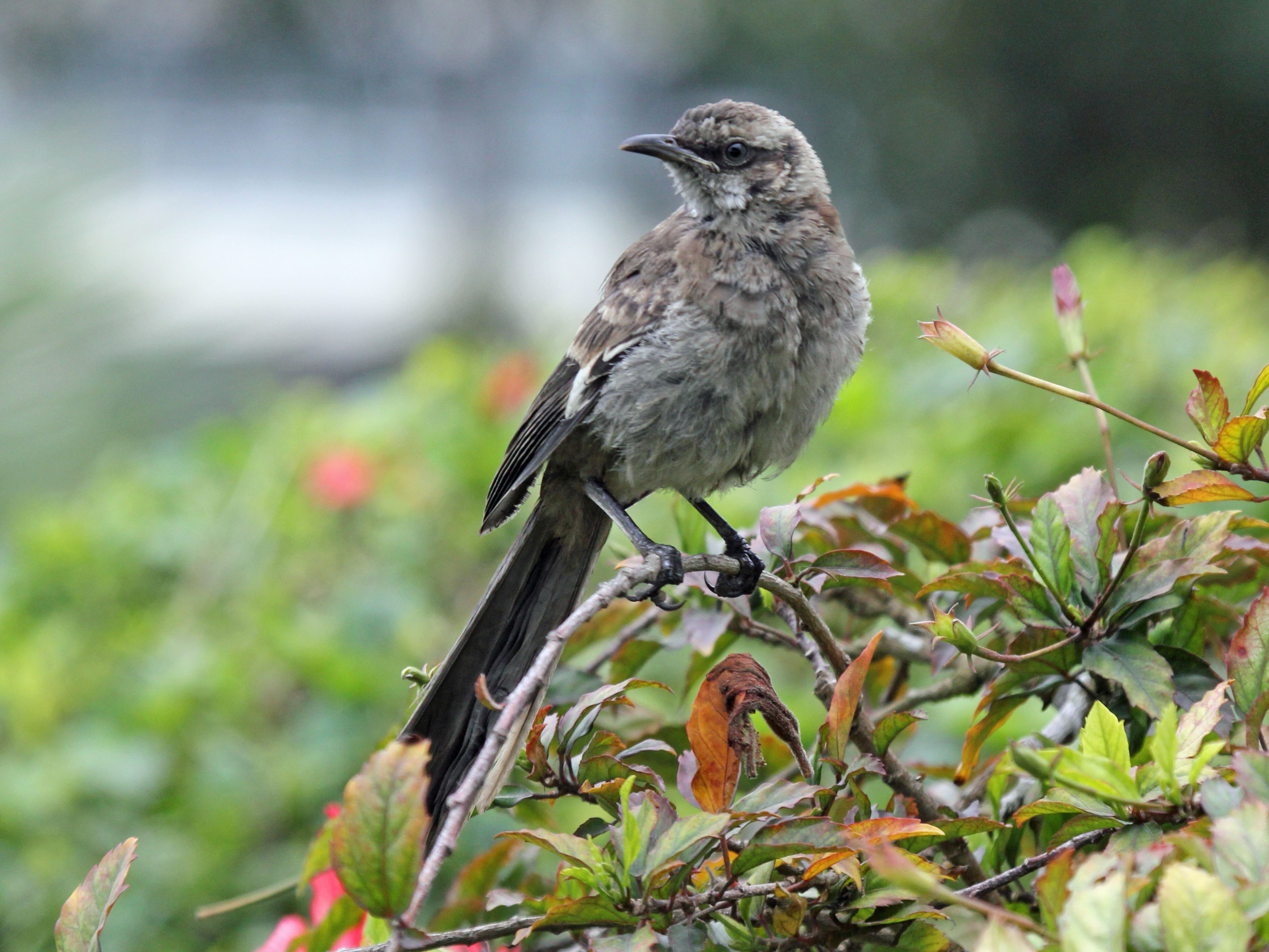
Lima, Peru

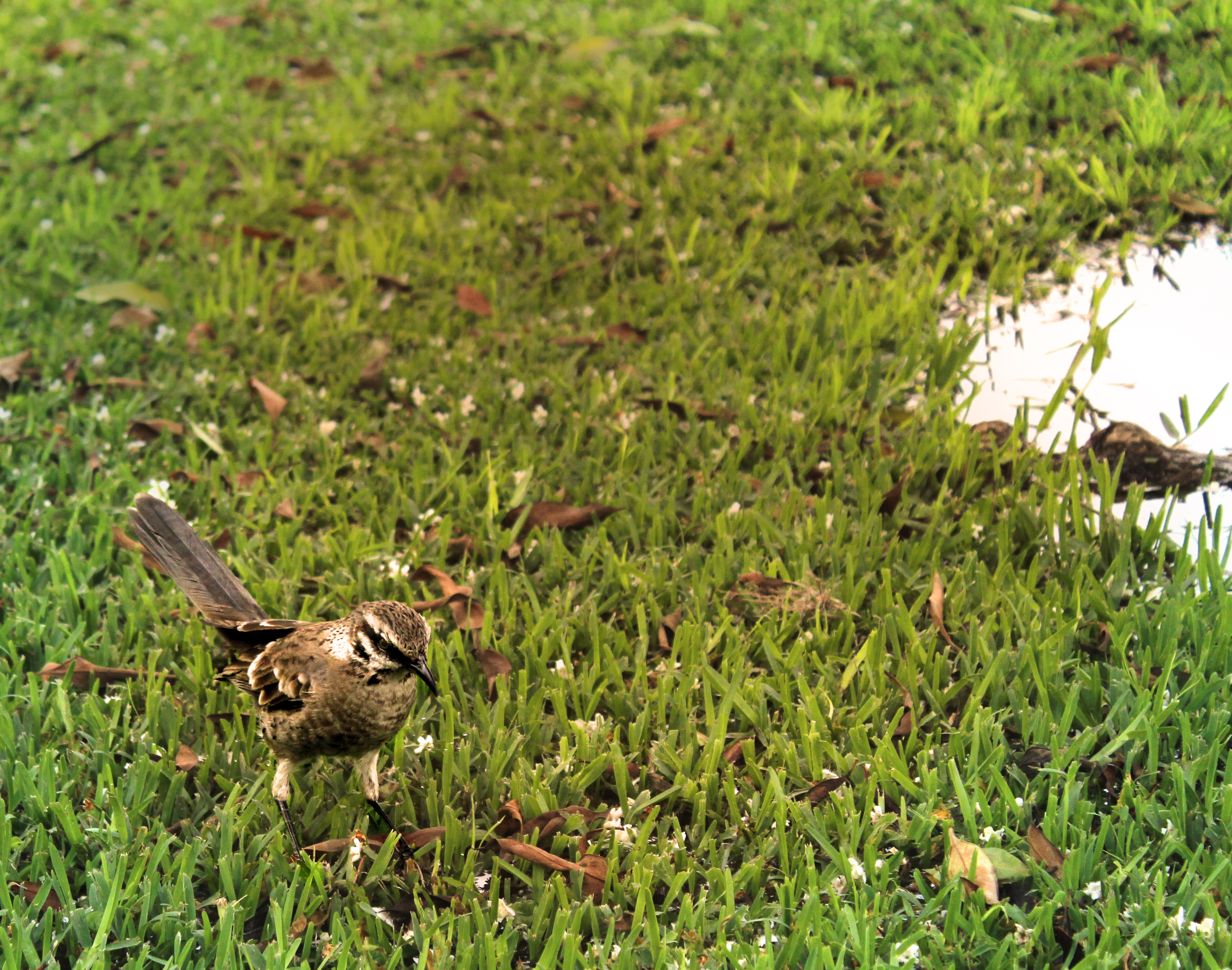
Long-tailed mockingbird at a park in Lima, Peru
