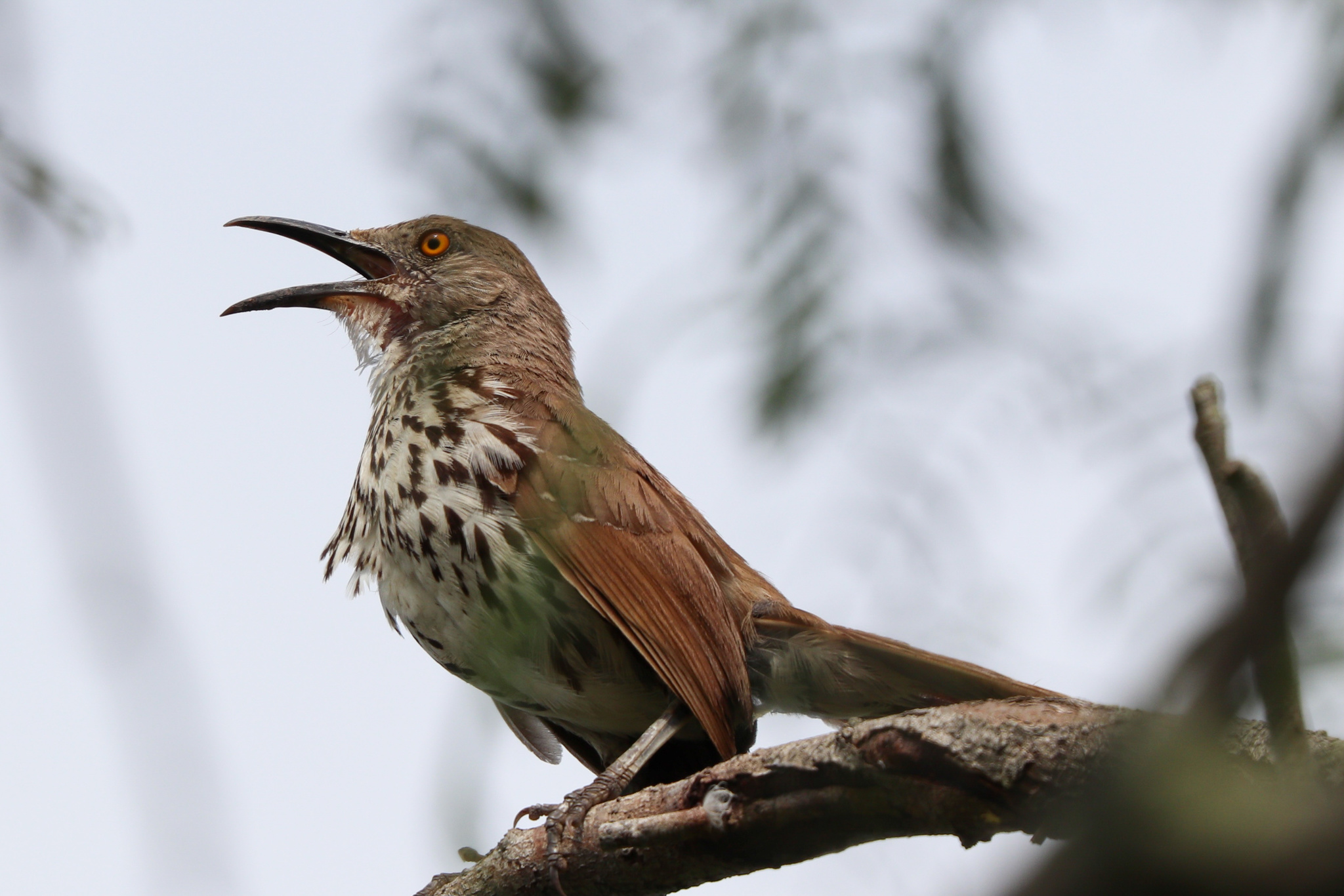
- Long-billed thrasher Toxostoma longirostre

Scientific classification
- Kingdom: Animalia
- Phylum: Chordata
- Class: Aves
- Order: Passeriformes
- Superfamily: Muscicapoidea
- Family: Mimidae; Bonaparte, 1853

Genera
- Allenia; Cinclocerthia; Dumetella; Margarops; Melanoptila; Melanotis; Mimus; Oreoscoptes; Ramphocinclus; Toxostoma

= Mimid =

Mimids

Family of birds

The mimids are the New World family of passerine birds, Mimidae, that includes thrashers, mockingbirds, tremblers, and the New World catbirds. As their name (Latin for "mimic") suggests, these birds are notable for their vocalization, especially some species' remarkable ability to mimic a wide variety of birds and other sounds heard outdoors. They are commonly referred to as mimic thrushes but are not, in fact, thrushes (which are members of family Turdidae).

== Description ==
There are over 30 species of mimids in two larger and some ten small or monotypic genera. They tend toward dull grays and browns in their appearance, though a few are black or blue-gray, and many have red, yellow, or white irises. They range from 20 to 33 centimetres in length, and 36 to 56 grams in weight. Many mimids have a rather thrush-like pattern: brown above, pale with dark streaks or spots below. They tend to have longer tails than thrushes (or the bigger wrens, which they also resemble) and longer bills that in many species curve downward.

They have long, strong legs (for passerines) with which many species hop through undergrowth searching for arthropods and fruits to eat. Their habitat varies from forest undergrowth to scrub, high-altitude grasslands, and deserts. The two tremblers live in the atypical habitat of rainforests in the Lesser Antilles, and the brown trembler has the particularly atypical behavior of foraging while clinging to tree trunks.

All known species build somewhat messy, bulky twig nests in dense growth, which are in most species on the ground or no more than 2 meters up. They usually lay 2 to 5 eggs that hatch in 12 or 13 days, which is also the length of time the chicks stay in the nest. Breeding usually starts in the spring or early in the rainy season, and many species can have two or even three broods per year. Most failures to fledge young are due to predation. Pairs often stay together for more than one breeding season.

== In the history of science ==
In Charles Darwin's voyage to the Galapagos islands, the Nesomimus mockingbirds may have played at least as great a role as Darwin's finches in inspiring Darwin's work on his theory of evolution.

== Systematics ==
=== Outside the family ===
Phylogenetic analyses have shown that mimids are most closely related to starlings. These and oxpeckers (and the Philippine creepers if they are not outright but highly apomorphic starlings) form a group of Muscicapoidea which originated probably in the Early Miocene – very roughly 25–20 mya – somewhere in East Asia. This is evidenced by the Asian-SW Pacific distribution of the most basal starlings (and Philippine creepers) and the North American range of the basal mimids.

They are sometimes united with the starlings in the Sturnidae as a tribe Mimini as proposed by Sibley & Monroe (1990). This makes the expanded Sturnidae a rather noninformative group and is probably due to the methodological drawbacks of their DNA-DNA hybridization technique.

The following cladogram shows the relationships between the families in the superfamily Muscicapoidea. It is based on a large molecular phylogenetic study of the passerines by Carl Oliveros and coworkers that was published in 2019.

- Muscicapoidea
  - - Elachuridae – spotted elachura
    - - Cinclidae – dippers (5 species)
      - - - Turdidae – thrushes (193 species)
          - Muscicapidae – chats, Old World flycatchers (357 species)
        - - Buphagidae – oxpeckers (2 species)
          - - Mimidae – mockingbirds, thrashers (35 species)
            - Sturnidae – starlings, rhabdornis (126 species)

=== Within the family ===
The mockingbirds with some thrashers seem to form one major clade, while the two other groups and the remaining thrashers seem to form another, but the basal branching pattern is not well resolved. The tremblers, again, are a monophyletic lineage. The latter, however, are embedded in a paraphyletic catbird-Caribbean thrasher assemblage which consists of many rather basal lineages.

For detailed information on the evolutionary relationships of the different mimid lineages, see their articles.

Mockingbirds:

- Genus Mimus – typical mockingbirds (some 10 species, includes Mimodes)
- The former genus Nesomimus, now part of Mimus – mockingbirds of the Galápagos Islands (4 species)
- Genus Melanotis – blue mockingbirds (2 species)

New World catbirds:

- Genus Dumetella – grey catbird
- Genus Melanoptila – black catbird

Thrashers:

- Genus Oreoscoptes – sage thrasher
- Genus Toxostoma – typical thrashers (10 species)
- Genus Ramphocinclus – white-breasted thrasher
- Genus Allenia – scaly-breasted thrasher (formerly in Margarops)
- Genus Margarops – pearly-eyed thrasher

Tremblers

- Genus Cinclocerthia (2 species)

The following genus-level cladogram is based on a molecular phylogenetic study by Irby Lovette and collaborators that was published in 2012.

- Mimidae
  - - Toxostoma – thrashers (10 species)
    - - Oreoscoptes – sage thrasher
      - Mimus – mockingbirds (14 species)
  - - Melanotis – mockingbirds (2 species)
    - - Melanoptila – black catbird
      - - - Ramphocinclus – thrashers (2 species)
          - Dumetella – gray catbird
        - - Allenia – scaly-breasted thrasher
          - - Margarops – pearly-eyed thrasher
            - Cinclocerthia – tremblers (2 species)
