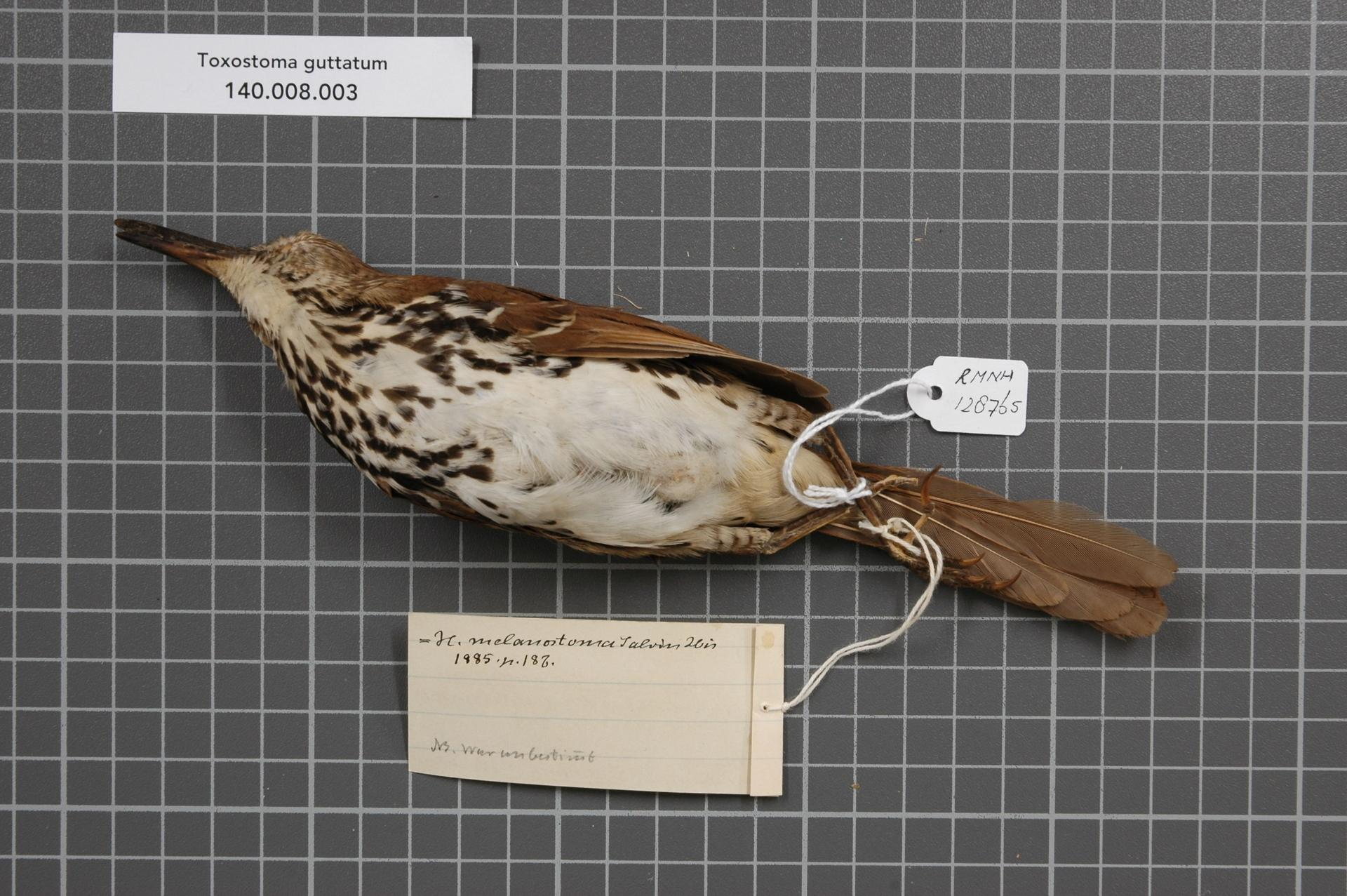

Conservation status
- Critically Endangered (IUCN 3.1)

Scientific classification
- Kingdom: Animalia
- Phylum: Chordata
- Class: Aves
- Order: Passeriformes
- Family: Mimidae
- Genus: Toxostoma
- Species: T. guttatum

Binomial name
- Toxostoma guttatum (Ridgway, 1885)
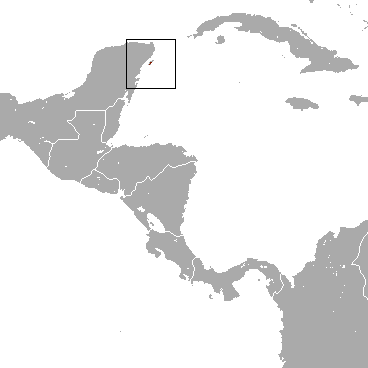
- Cozumel thrasher range

= Cozumel thrasher =

Species of bird

The Cozumel thrasher (Toxostoma guttatum) is a bird from the mockingbird family (Mimidae), which is endemic to the island of Cozumel off the Yucatán Peninsula, Mexico. It is believed to be the most critically endangered species of bird in Mexico – if it indeed still exists, which is probable but not certain.

This bird is closely related to the long-billed and brown thrashers. It has been generally described as shy, but there have been descriptions to the contrary. It was once abundant throughout Cozumel before two hurricanes greatly affected its numbers. Invasive species are also thought to have impacted the population of the thrasher.

== Taxonomy ==
The Cozumel thrasher was first described as Harporhynchus guttatus by Robert Ridgway in 1885. It has been described as a subspecies to its relative the long-billed thrasher (Toxostoma longirostre), but was considered a separate species when it was determined in a 1998 study that it differed genetically more than five percent from both the long-billed and brown thrashers (T. rufum). In the same study it was determined to be the basal member of the rufum group of Toxostoma thrashers. The bird is monotypic.

== Description ==
The thrasher is 21.5 to 24 centimetres (8.5 to 9.4 in) in length. The adult has a brown crown, back, shoulders, and rump that becomes more red in its tint on its lower back and rump. Greater and lesser coverts are a warm brown with concealed white tips, preceded with a black bar. Primaries and secondaries are grayish-brown with warm rufous-brown outer webs. The rectrices are also have a warm brown color. The lores and ear-coverts are a mottled grey brown. The chin and throat are an off-white color with a blackish partial malar stripe. The chest is a buffy-white in color with stark black teardrop shaped spots. The belly is off-white, and the flanks have larger black spots. Its vent is buffy and an underwing that is buffy-white with darker markings. The iris is yellow, the bill is grayish-brown, and the legs are brown with a dull tint. Juveniles' plumage have not been recorded, but presumably is similar in development to adulthood like the long-billed and brown thrasher.

=== Similar species ===
The Cozumel thrasher is similar in appearance to the long-billed thrasher (Toxostoma longirostre, 26.5–29 centimetres or 10.4–11.4 inches in length), but is smaller, darker in color, has a blacker bill, and the markings are more sharply defined. No other thrasher species coexist on the island, but the Cozumel thrasher may be confused with the migratory wood thrush (Hylocichla mustelina). The wood thrush differs in lacking wing bars, a shorter beak, and a different shape.

== Distribution and habitat ==
The distribution of the thrasher is restricted to Isla Cozumel which is 45 km long and 20 km wide.

The habitat preferences for the thrasher is thought to be in low and medium deciduous and semi-deciduous forests. It may have once been most abundant in forest edges adjacent to clearings.

== Behavior and ecology ==
The thrasher is predominately terrestrial and elusive and as with all members of the genus Toxostoma, it may resort to running instead of flying when startled. Ornithologists Ludlow Griscom and Raymond A. Paynter, Jr. had noted its secretive behavior, but James Bond did not.

The song is described as a rich varied warbling, slightly scratchy with little repetition. Bond described its alarm note being similar to the brown thrasher.

== Status ==
The numbers of this bird declined rapidly when Hurricane Gilbert hit this island on September 14, 1988. Until it was sighted in June 2004, this bird had last been seen in 1995, the same year that Hurricane Roxanne hit Cozumel on October 11, and it was widely believed to have become extinct.

It is still unclear what damage the impact of Hurricanes Emily and Wilma in 2005 caused; it seems that the bird was not found anymore during a survey in December 2006.

Inquiry from the local population had suggested that the species would likely be encountered near the Mayan ruins of San Gervasio.

The last – unconfirmed – sightings were in April 2006, where an apparent T. guttatum was sighted at the Cozumel Golf Club; in October and December 2007, thrashers were also seen but could not be reliably identified as T. guttatum. Relocation efforts continue; though at least a few birds seem to survive, the continuing existence of this species had not been verified as of January 2008.

Some scientists believe that other factors must have contributed to the bird's decline, because the Cozumel thrasher likely survived hurricanes for millennia. Introduced species, including predatory boa constrictors—which were released on the island in 1971 during or after the filming of The Garden of Aunt Isabel and are now abundant—may also have had a detrimental effect.
