= San Gervasio (Maya site) =

Archaeological Maya site on Cozumel in Mexico

- Location within Cozumel Location within Mexico
- 20.500351°N 86.848297°W
- Periods: Early Classic to Colonial
- Cultures: Maya civilization
- Location: San Miguel de Cozumel, Quintana Roo, Mexico
- Region: Quintana Roo

History
- Built: Early Classic
- Abandoned: Between 1520 and 1600

Site notes
- Architectural styles: Mayapan and East Coast styles

San Gervasio is an archaeological site of the pre-Columbian Maya civilization, located in the northern third of the island of Cozumel off the northeastern coast of the Yucatán Peninsula, in what is now the Mexican state of Quintana Roo. San Gervasio's pre-Hispanic name was Tantun Cuzamil, Mayan for Flat Rock in the place of the Swallows. The ruins were once a hub of worship of the goddess Ix Chel, an aged deity of childbirth, fertility, medicine, and weaving. Pre-Columbian Maya women would try to travel to San Gervasio and make offerings at least once in their lives. In 1560, the Spanish historian, Diego Lopez de Cogolludo, wrote: "The pilgrims arrive at Cozumel for the fulfillment of their vows to offer their sacrifices, to ask help for their needs, and for the mistaken adoration of their false gods." The bishop of Yucatán, Diego de Landa, wrote in 1549 that the Maya "held Cozumel in the same veneration as we have for pilgrimages to Jerusalem and Rome, and so they used to go to visit and offer presents there, as we do to holy places; and if they did not go themselves, they always sent their offerings."

== History ==
=== Prehistory ===
San Gervasio lies in the interior of northern Cozumel, about 7 km (4.3 mi) east of San Miguel de Cozumel. The settlement was established over the island's largest permanent source of groundwater, which provided water for its inhabitants.

San Gervasio was founded around 300 CE as a small community. Around 600, it began a period of rapid growth, with new construction and possible stronger connections with settlements on the northern coast of Quintana Roo. After about 1000, San Gervasio expanded significantly, possibly influenced by the growing political and economic importance of Chichén Itzá.

By about 1200, San Gervasio had become the largest settlement on Cozumel and remained so until the arrival of the Spanish in the early 16th century. Most of the buildings visible at the site today were constructed during this period. San Gervasio may also have been associated with a network of smaller communities established across Cozumel.

=== European contact ===
The Spanish first reached Cozumel in 1518 during an expedition led by the Spanish explorer Juan de Grijalva. At the time of Spanish arrival, Cozumel was densely populated, and San Gervasio was the largest settlement on the island.

Spanish accounts describe at least three important settlements on Cozumel, but none contains a description that can be identified with San Gervasio. Mexican archaeologist Adriana Velázquez Morlet suggests that the Spanish may not have reached San Gervasio because they did not travel far enough into the island's interior.

In February 1519, one year after Grijalva's expedition, the Spanish conquistador Hernán Cortés reached Cozumel with a fleet of 11 ships.

In 1520, a flotilla led by the Spanish conquistador Pánfilo de Narváez stopped at Cozumel while travelling from Cuba to Veracruz. Lucas Vázquez de Ayllón, a Spanish judge travelling with the expedition, later reported that he found few Maya remaining on Cozumel and attributed their disappearance to smallpox introduced by Indigenous people brought from Cuba as auxiliaries to the Spaniards. The Narváez expedition subsequently introduced smallpox to the Mexican mainland.

== Structures ==
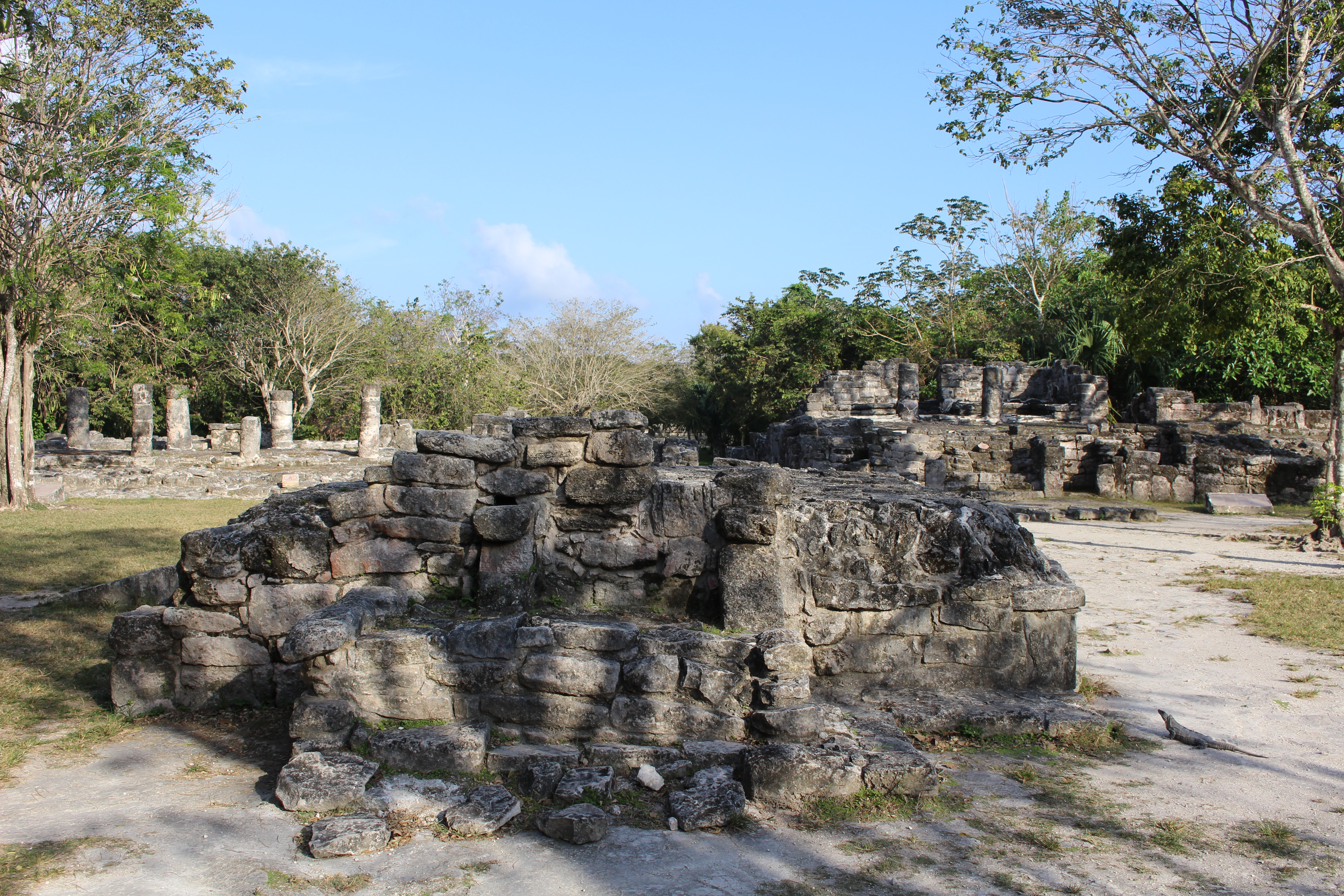
"The Altar" on the central plaza. In the background are Las Columnas ("the Columns") on the left and Los Nichos ("the Niches") on the right.

San Gervasio consists of several groups of buildings rather than a single compact centre. The settlement was founded around 300 CE, but most of the buildings that survive today were constructed after about 1200 CE, during the final centuries before the Spanish conquest. By this time, San Gervasio had become the largest settlement on Cozumel. Because the site developed over many centuries, its surviving buildings represent different periods in its history.

Most of the later buildings were constructed in the East Coast architectural style, an architectural tradition found along the Caribbean coast of the Yucatán Peninsula. Some older buildings also survive. At Murciélagos, a building dating to around 800 CE is the best-preserved structure at San Gervasio from the Terminal Classic period, which lasted from about 800 to 1000 CE. Some researchers have compared its architecture with the Puuc style found elsewhere in the Yucatán Peninsula, while the Instituto Nacional de Antropología e Historia (INAH) describes it as part of a distinct local building tradition.

The buildings are divided into architectural groups connected by sacbés, raised paved roads built by the Maya. The principal groups are Manitas, Chichán Nah, El Álamo, Nohoch Nah, Murciélagos, Ka'na Nah and El Ramonal.

Most of San Gervasio's stone buildings have lost their roofs and the upper parts of their walls, making their original appearance difficult to visualize from the ruins alone. During archaeological work in the early 1970s, researchers from Harvard University and the University of Arizona made detailed plans of the surviving remains. From these plans, they produced drawings showing how several of the buildings may originally have looked.

=== Chichán Nah ===
Chichán Nah, meaning "Small House", is a small Postclassic temple immediately east of Las Manitas. INAH identifies the building as an oratory and describes it as an example of the East Coast architectural style.

The temple is divided into two spaces. A larger outer room leads into a smaller inner sanctuary containing an altar. The building has traditionally been interpreted as a chapel used by the family of the halach uinik, or ruler, who lived at the neighbouring Las Manitas residence.

The orientation of Chichán Nah has also been studied for its possible relationship to Maya astronomy. Archaeoastronomer Ivan Šprajc found that its alignment resembles several other buildings at San Gervasio, but cautions that Chichán Nah itself may not have been suitable for making astronomical observations.

=== District 1 Central Plaza ===
Meaning:

Constructed during: Post-Classic (1200-1650 AD)

Location: Northwest of the entrance to the ruins

The Plaza Group consists of 6 buildings arranged in a square around a central altar platform. Several of these buildings once had roofs made of timber and thatch, which have since rotted away. Others had roofs of wood beams and poured mortar, while a few had rooms constructed of corbeled arches. All were public buildings and included temples, oratories, altars, and a building used to house visitors who came to participate in religious events taking place in the plaza.

=== El Arco ===
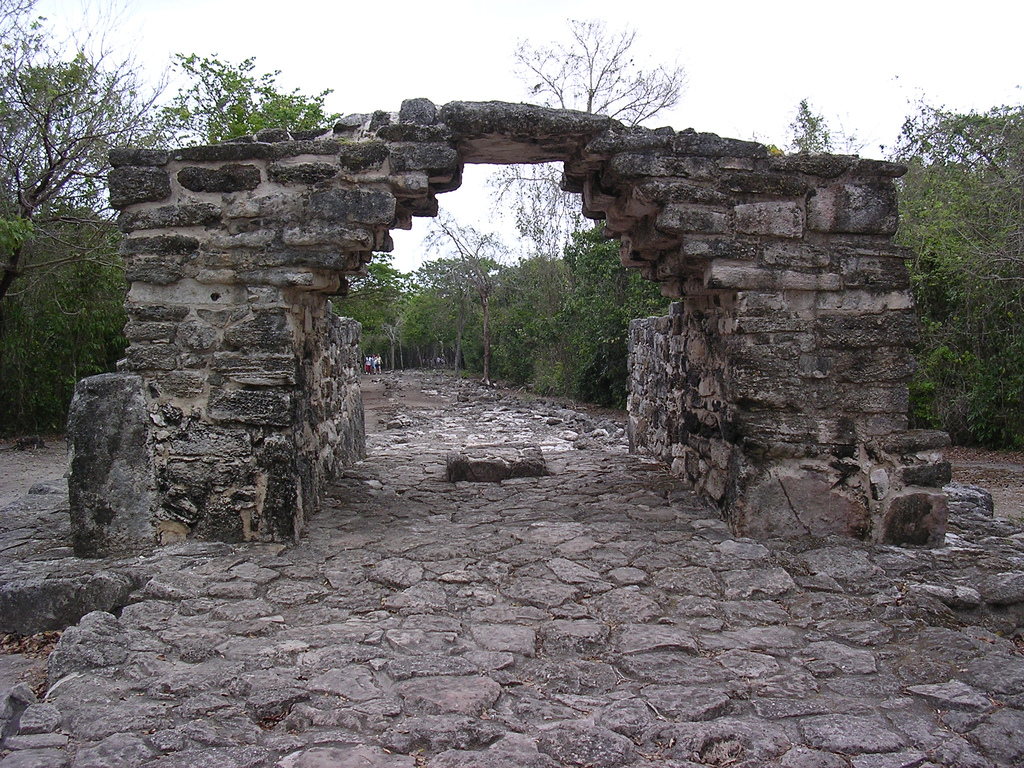
The arch at San Gervasio

Meaning: The Arch

Constructed during: A reconstruction erected in the 1980s

Location: Northeast of District 1 Central Plaza

This arch is the main entrance from the north and west to San Gervasio’s District 1 Central Plaza Group. It is a simple arch about seven feet tall that straddles the main religious pathway (called a sacbe in Mayan, a word meaning "white road") running northeast from the plaza. It was reconstructed by INAH in the form of similar arches found at other sites on the east coast of Quintana Roo, such as El Cedral, located on the southern portion of Cozumel.

To the north of this arch, on the western edge of the religious pathway lies a small hole in the bedrock, similar to others that can be found throughout the ruins. These natural karst formations are called cenotes (from the Mayan word ‘’d'zonot’’) and served as water sources for the inhabitants of San Gervasio.

=== El Ramonal ===
El Ramonal is a complex of three groups of buildings covering an area about 60 to 80 by 200 m (200 to 260 by 660 ft). During the Early Classic period, it served as the civic and administrative centre of Cozumel.

The southern part of El Ramonal was a residential area, bordered by large limestone blocks reaching 3 m (9.8 ft) in height. Immediately north of it was a raised complex resembling an acropolis, consisting of two large stepped platforms with buildings on top. Some of these buildings were constructed of masonry, while others were made from perishable materials that have not survived. Elsewhere in the complex are two oval, pyramid-like platforms; the temples that once stood on top of them are no longer preserved.

Archaeological investigation of El Ramonal began in 1997 as part of an Instituto Nacional de Antropología e Historia (INAH) project studying the inhabitants of Cozumel during the Late Preclassic and Early Classic periods. Archaeologists also carried out conservation work, including restoration of part of a large stone wall surrounding an area known as the Plaza Baja and restoration of the Building of the Battlements (Edificio de las Almenas). The rooms of the latter form a T-shaped plan resembling the Maya ik sign, a symbol associated with divine breath and the breath of life and one of the principal attributes of the Maya creator god Itzamná.

=== Ka'na Nah ===
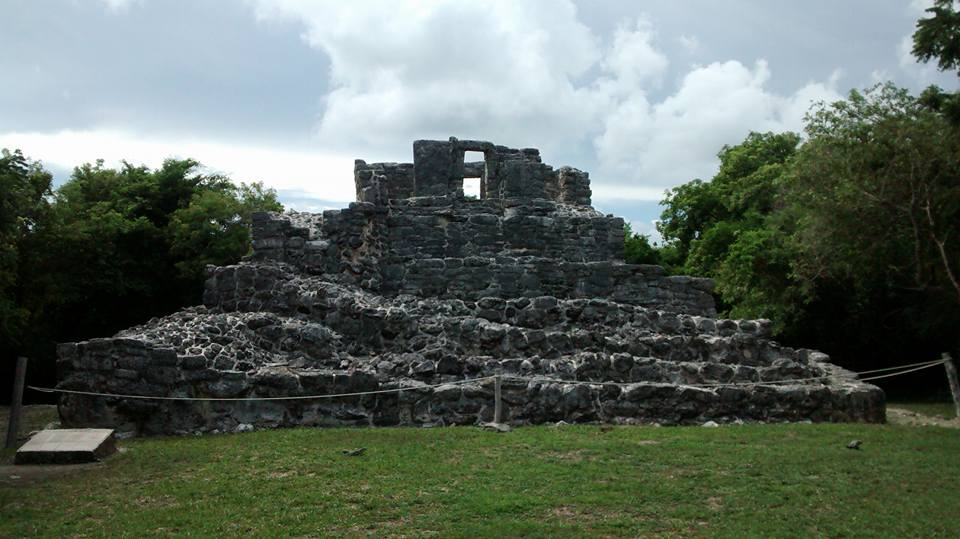
Ka'na Nah at San Gervasio.

Ka'na Nah, meaning "Tall House", is one of the tallest and most important buildings at San Gervasio. Located west of the Central Plaza and designated Structure C22-41-a by archaeologists, it has a broad stepped base supporting a small temple. The building was altered several times, with its latest construction dating to the Late Postclassic period, before the Spanish arrived on Cozumel in 1518.

The temple faces west and originally had a single-room sanctuary with an altar. During a later building phase, a wall with a central doorway was added across the room, leaving narrow passages on either side into the space behind it.

Slovenian archaeologist and archaeoastronomer Ivan Šprajc found that the building's main axis corresponds approximately to sunset around the June solstice and sunrise around the December solstice. Around the June solstice, sunlight entering the temple could cast shadows onto the later interior wall, leaving narrow areas of light on either side of its doorway.

American archaeologists David Freidel and Jeremy Sabloff interpreted Ka'na Nah as a possible temple of Ix Chel. They compared its divided sanctuary with a 1552 account by the Spanish historian Francisco López de Gómara of an oracle on Cozumel. Gómara described a hollow ceramic image fixed to a wall, with a concealed space behind it where a priest could enter and speak to worshippers through the image. In 1688, the Spanish historian Diego López de Cogolludo wrote that offerings to the image included birds, dogs and human blood, and that human sacrifices were also made.

The identification remains uncertain. The colonial accounts probably describe a shrine near present-day San Miguel de Cozumel rather than San Gervasio. The Instituto Nacional de Antropología e Historia states that no archaeological evidence has been found linking any building at San Gervasio specifically with Ix Chel.

=== Las Manitas ===
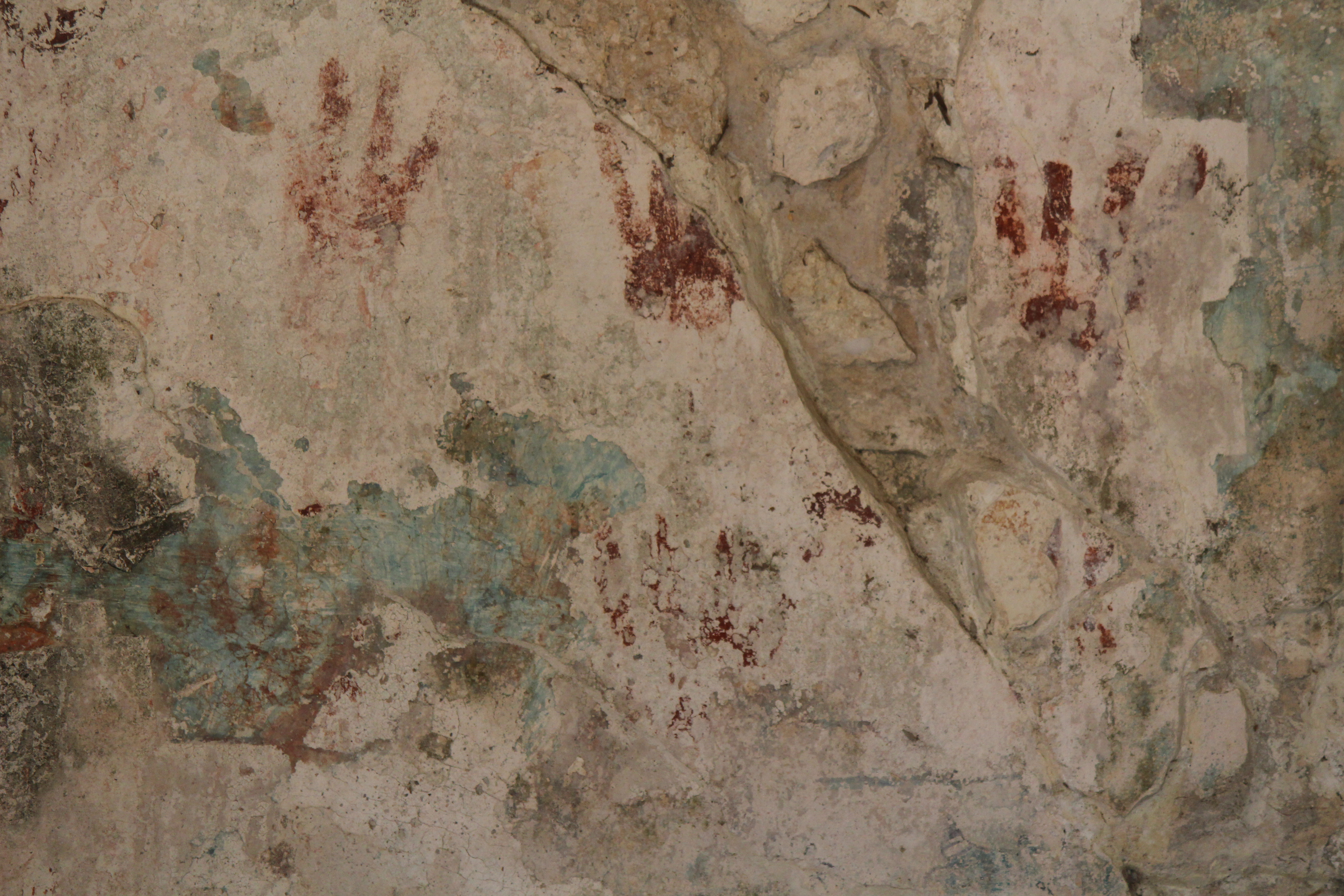
Red handprints preserved at Las Manitas.

The Manitas architectural group dates to the Late Postclassic period, about 1250–1550 CE, the final centuries of pre-Hispanic occupation at San Gervasio. Its principal building, Las Manitas, meaning "Little Hands", was a residence built in the East Coast architectural style. An INAH plan of the site identifies it more specifically as an elite residence.

The residence has two rooms, a layout characteristic of the East Coast style at San Gervasio. The front room is an open, porch-like space with a built-in stone bench, where much of the household's everyday activity probably took place. From this more public space, a doorway leads into a smaller and more private room at the back, interpreted as a bedroom. Immediately east of the residence stands Chichán Nah, meaning "Small House", a small temple built in the same architectural style. Together, the buildings show how residential and ritual spaces stood side by side within an elite part of the settlement.

Las Manitas takes its name from human handprints preserved on its walls. Archaeologist Antonio Benavides Castillo identifies the building as structure SE(AIV)30 and records five hand impressions on its façade. INAH also records hand impressions surviving on the building's interior walls. Hand impressions are known from buildings and caves throughout the Maya world; they were made by pressing painted palms and fingers directly against a surface, and red was the colour most commonly used.

=== La Tumba ===
La Tumba ("The Tomb") is a structure in the Manitas group at San Gervasio. The structure formed part of a larger pattern in the layout of San Gervasio. Šprajc identifies its alignment with sunrise at the December solstice and sunset at the June solstice. The same general orientation occurs throughout the Manitas and Central groups, which are connected by Sacbé 2 along approximately the same axis.

=== Murciélagos ===
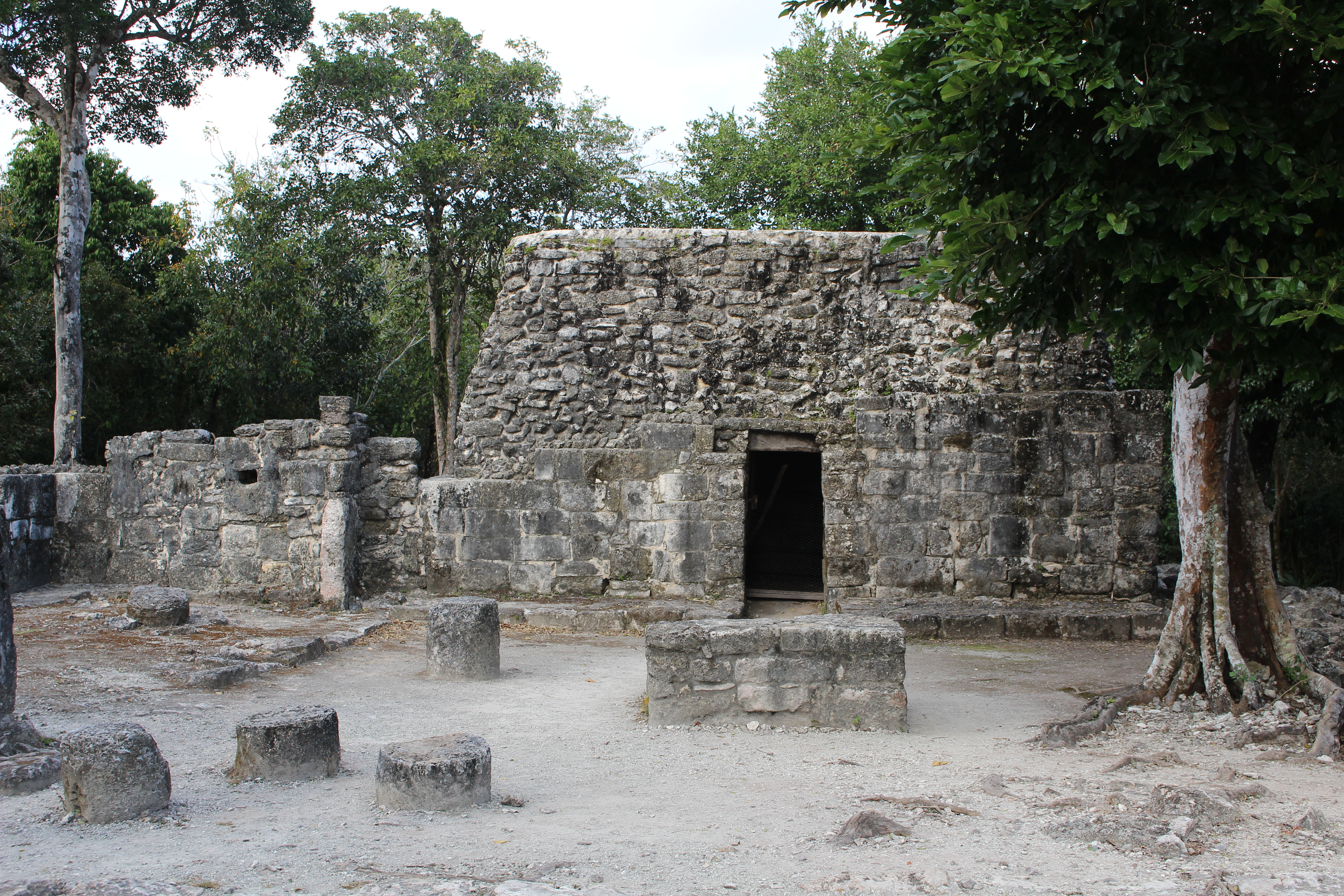
The Murciélagos architectural group. Its best-preserved building dates to around 800 CE and is the best-preserved example of Terminal Classic architecture at San Gervasio.

Murciélagos is an architectural group consisting of an irregular platform supporting five buildings. Its name, meaning "Bats", comes from the large numbers of bats that once inhabited the interior of its main building during a period when it was unoccupied.

The best-preserved building was constructed around 800 CE, during the Terminal Classic period, several centuries before most of the structures now visible at San Gervasio. It is the best-preserved example of Terminal Classic architecture at the site. Although some researchers have compared its architecture with the Puuc style of the Yucatán Peninsula, INAH describes it as a distinctive local style, reflecting the development of a construction technique particular to Cozumel.

=== Nohoch Nah ===
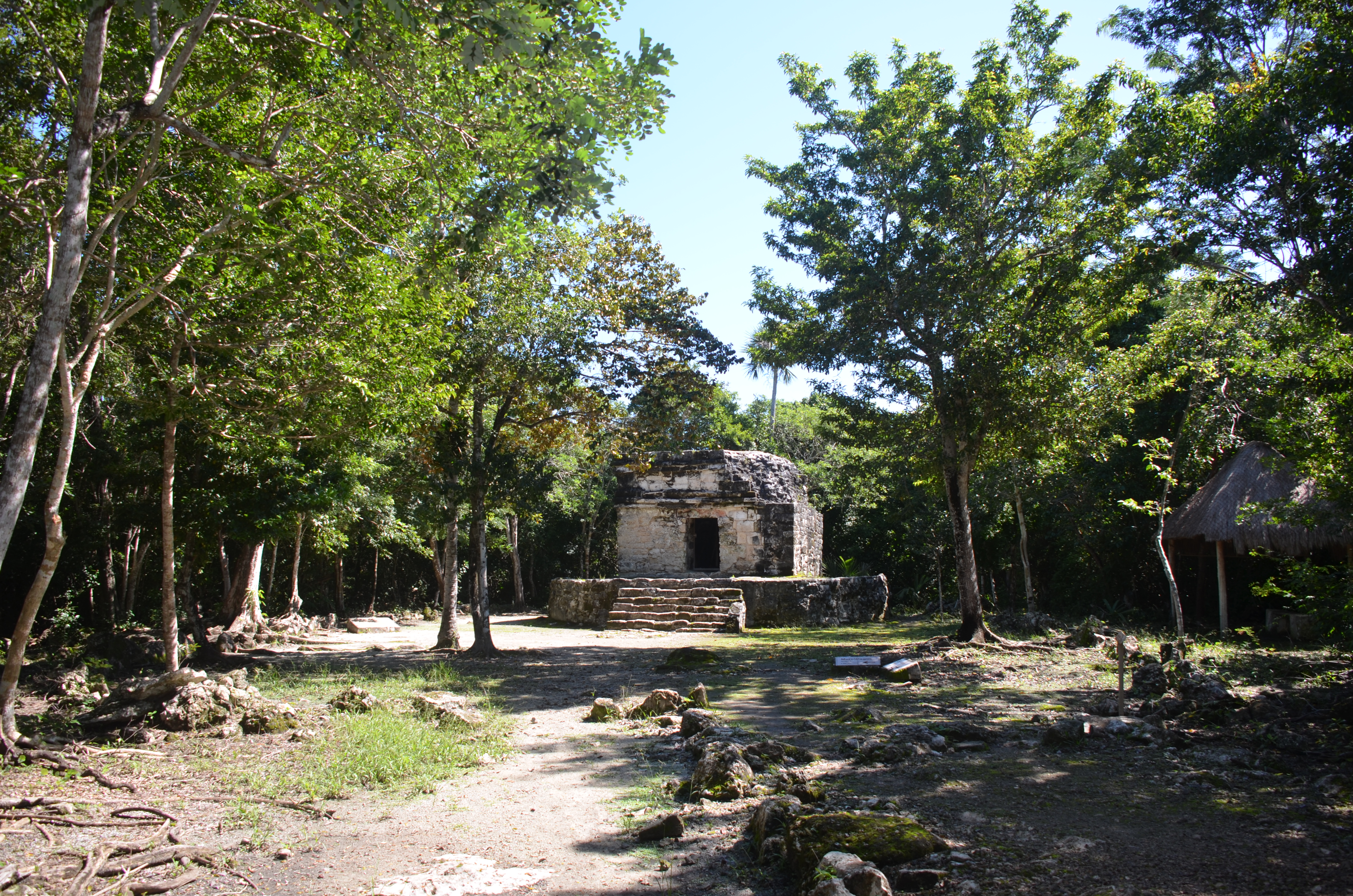
Nohoch Nah, one of the best-preserved buildings at San Gervasio. The Postclassic temple retains its stone roof and stands on a low raised platform.

Nohoch Nah, meaning "Great House", is a Postclassic temple built on a small raised platform with two access stairways. One of the best-preserved buildings at San Gervasio, it retains its roof.

The temple stands at the end of Sacbé 1, a raised road beginning at El Arco in the El Álamo group. Beyond Nohoch Nah, the road changes direction and continues towards the northeastern coast of Cozumel. Šprajc suggests that the temple may have marked the limits of the city.

Fragments of mural painting survive on the interior walls of the temple. Traces of red, ochre and blue pigment remain visible. The interior is closed to the public, but can be viewed through the doorway. Guidebook author Ric Hajovsky identifies Nohoch Nah as a temple dedicated to Kukulcán, the Maya feathered-serpent deity.

== Public access ==
San Gervasio is open to visitors as an archaeological zone. Although the archaeological remains extend across several square kilometres, only part of District 1 is open to the public, including the Central Plaza Group and several nearby structures.

Some individual structures cannot be entered. The interior of Nohoch Nah, for example, is closed to visitors, although surviving traces of its painted decoration can be viewed through the doorway.
