= Cozumel =

Island in Quintana Roo, Mexico

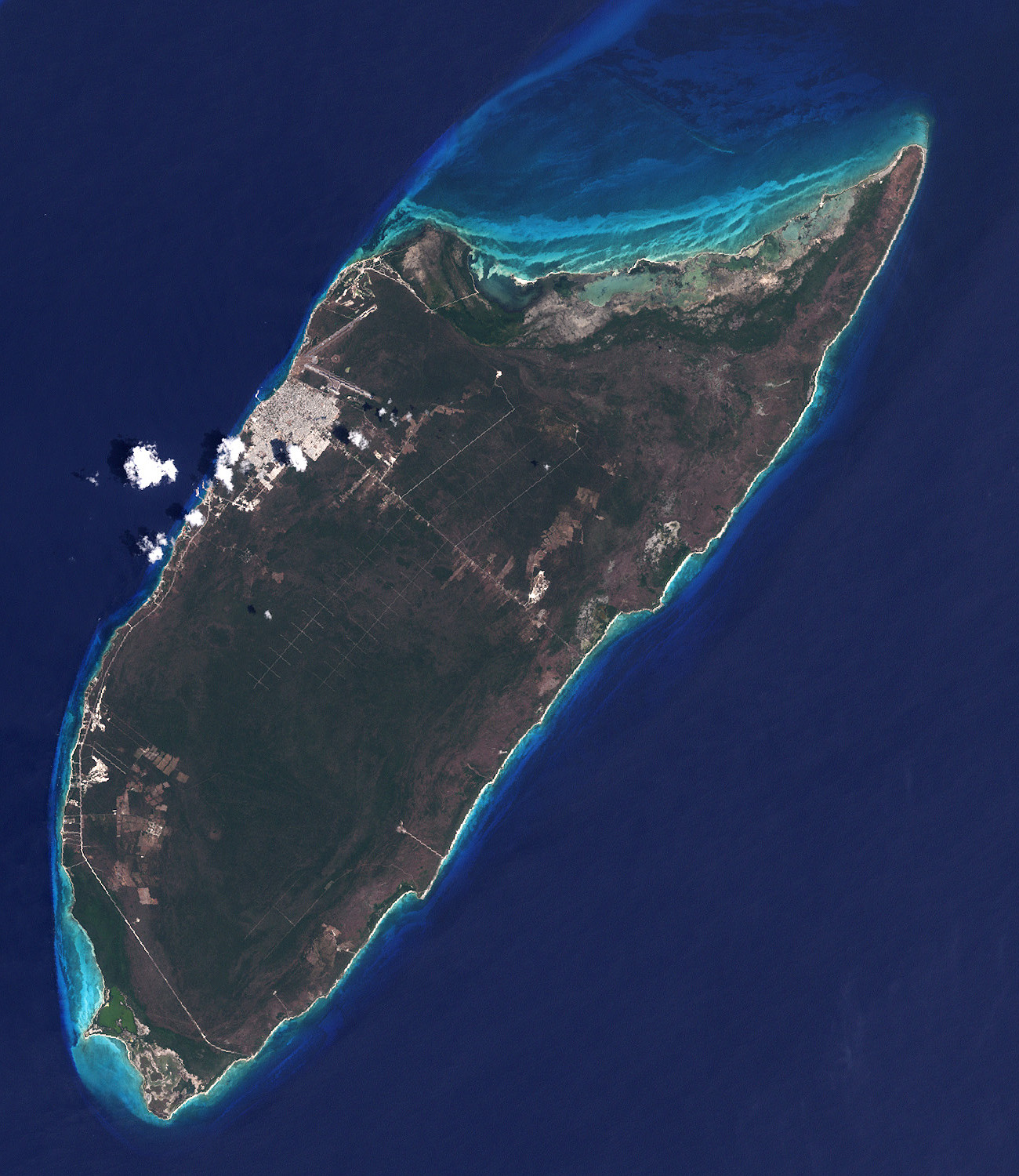
- Satellite image of Cozumel Island in 2001

- Location of Cozumel in Quintana Roo State

- Location within Mexico

Geography
- Location: Caribbean Sea
- Coordinates: 20°25′N 86°55′W
- Total islands: 2
- Area: 647.33 km^{2} (249.94 sq mi)
- Highest point: 14 m

Administration
- Mexico
- State: Quintana Roo
- Municipality: Cozumel
- Largest settlement: San Miguel de Cozumel (pop. 84 915)
- Presidente municipal (Municipal president): Juanita Obdulia Alonso Marrufo (Morena)

Demographics
- Demonym: Cozumeleño(a)
- Population: 88 626 (2020)
- Pop. density: 154.5/km^{2} (400.2/sq mi)
- Ethnic groups: Mestizo, Maya, White Mexicans, Afro-Mexicans

Additional information
- Time zone: UTC−05:00
- Official website: cozumel.gob.mx

Ramsar Wetland
- Official name: Parque Nacional Arrecifes de Cozumel
- Designated: February 2, 2005
- Reference no.: 1449

Ramsar Wetland
- Official name: Manglares y Humedales del Norte de Isla Cozumel
- Designated: February 2, 2009
- Reference no.: 1921

Cozumel (Spanish pronunciation: [kosuˈmel]; Yucatec Maya: Kùutsmil) is an island and municipality in the Caribbean Sea off the eastern coast of Mexico's Yucatán Peninsula, opposite Playa del Carmen. It is separated from the mainland by the Cozumel Channel and is close to the Yucatán Channel. The municipality is part of the state of Quintana Roo, Mexico.

In 2023, Cozumel was designated a Pueblo Mágico by the Mexican government, recognizing its cultural and historical importance.

== Etymology ==
The name Cozumel was derived from the Mayan "Cuzamil" (also spelled "Cutzmil") or "Ah Cuzamil Peten" in full, which means "the island of swallows" (Spanish: Isla de las Golondrinas).

== History ==
=== Prehispanic period ===
More than 30 archaeological sites have been identified on Cozumel, with evidence of occupation extending from the Late Preclassic period, about 300 BCE to 300 CE, until the arrival of the Spanish in the early 16th century. The sites range from large inland settlements to isolated coastal altars, some of which have been destroyed by modern construction.

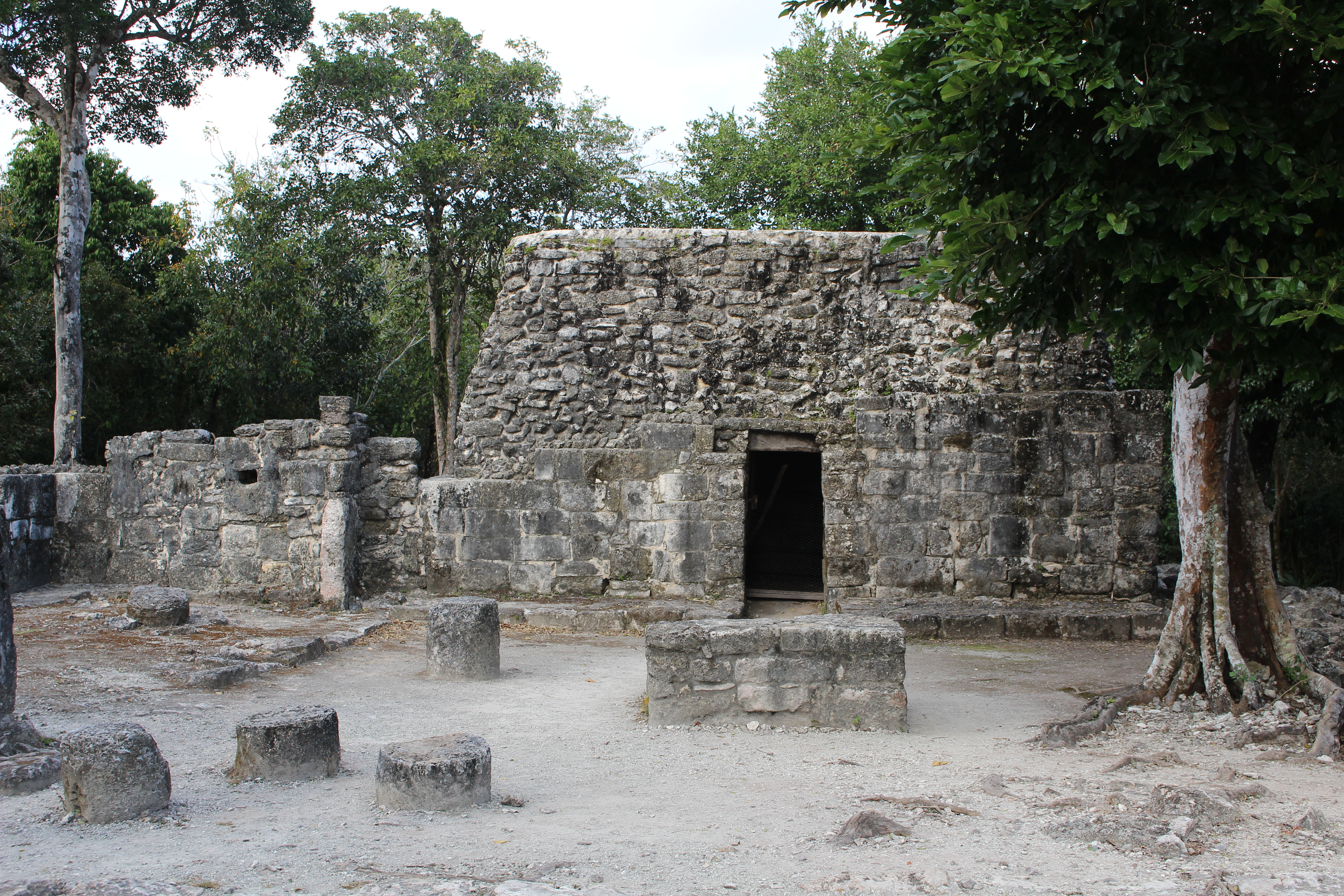
Maya ruins of San Gervasio

Cozumel flourished from about 1250 CE onward as an important port and pilgrimage centre, which encouraged the development of local honey and wax industries. It formed part of a maritime trade route that followed the coast of the Yucatán Peninsula from present-day Honduras to Tabasco and Campeche. Merchants and pilgrims travelled to the island, where they worshipped Ixchel, a Maya goddess associated with the moon, childbirth and weaving. There was likely a settlement of Chontal Maya traders from the present-day area of Tabasco or the Laguna de Términos.

San Gervasio was the most important city on Cozumel and participated in the trade network linking settlements across the Yucatán Peninsula. The settlement had a long period of occupation and consisted of several architectural groups connected by an extensive network of raised roads known as sacbés. It is dated principally to the Late Postclassic period, about 1250 to 1550 CE.

=== European contact ===
The first Spanish expedition to visit Cozumel was led by Juan de Grijalva in 1518. In the following year, Hernán Cortés stopped by the island on his way to Veracruz. The Grijalva and Cortés expeditions were both received peacefully by the Maya of Cozumel (unlike their experiences on the mainland). Even after Cortés destroyed some of the Maya idols on Cozumel and replaced them with an image of the Virgin Mary, the native inhabitants of the island continued to help the Spanish re-supply their ships with food and water so they could continue their voyages. Gerónimo de Aguilar, a captive of the Mayans, was rescued at this time.

As many as 10,000 Maya lived on the island during the early 1500s, but in 1520, infected crew members of the Pánfilo de Narváez expedition brought smallpox to the island, and by 1570, only 186 men and 172 women were left alive on Cozumel. In the ensuing years, Cozumel was often the target of attacks by pirates, and in 1650, many of the islanders were forcibly relocated to the mainland town of Xcan Boloná to avoid the buccaneers' predation. Later, in 1688, most of the rest of the island's population, as well as many of the settlements along the Quintana Roo coast, were evacuated inland to towns such as Chemax.

In 1848, refugees escaping the tumult of the Caste War of Yucatán settled on the island, and in 1849 the town of San Miguel de Cozumel was officially recognized by the Mexican government.

=== Proposed American acquisition ===
In 1861, American President Abraham Lincoln ordered his Secretary of State, William Henry Seward, to meet with the Mexican chargé d'affaires Matias Romero to explore the possibility of purchasing the island of Cozumel for the purpose of relocating freed American slaves offshore. The idea was summarily dismissed by Mexican President Benito Juarez, and Juarez is still revered by the people of Cozumel because of this action. In 1862, Lincoln did manage to establish a short-lived colony of ex-slaves on Île à Vache off the coast of Haiti.

=== Hurricanes ===
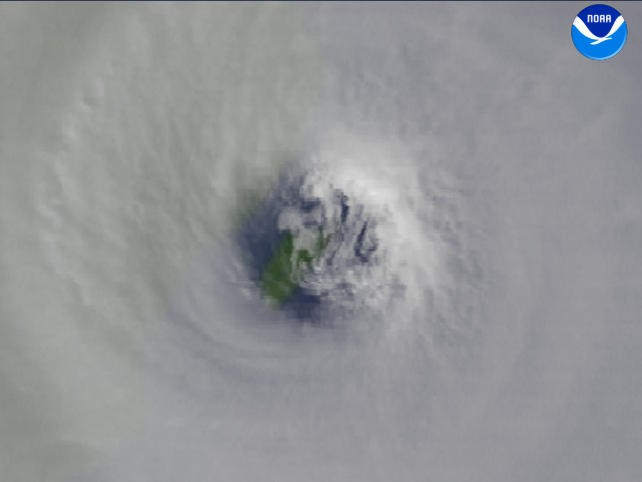
Cozumel seen through the eye of Hurricane Wilma

Cozumel lies in the western Caribbean, within the path of Atlantic hurricanes during the June-to-November hurricane season.

On September 16, 1967, Hurricane Beulah made landfall on Cozumel with maximum winds of about 160 kilometres per hour (100 mph). About 40 percent of the island's houses were destroyed, several hotels were severely damaged, and tourism was heavily affected.

Twenty-one years later, on September 14, 1988, Hurricane Gilbert passed directly over Cozumel before crossing the Yucatán Peninsula.

Cozumel was struck by two Category 4 hurricanes in 2005. On July 18, the eyewall of Hurricane Emily passed over the island before the storm crossed the Yucatán Peninsula. Emily brought winds of about 217 kilometres per hour (135 mph) to the region and extensively defoliated Cozumel's forests.

About three months later, on October 21, Hurricane Wilma crossed northeastern Cozumel with sustained winds of about 230 kilometres per hour (140 mph). The hurricane moved at only about 8.0 kilometres per hour (5 mph): its centre was about 24 kilometres (15 mi) east-southeast of Cozumel at 1 p.m. and crossed the island during the afternoon.

Wilma's centre remained near Cozumel's northern end at 7 p.m., several hours after reaching the island. Studies of the island's reefs found that Emily and Wilma together reduced live coral cover by 56 percent, with Wilma causing substantially greater damage.

Hurricanes have continued to affect the island. Hurricane Delta brought hurricane-force wind gusts to Cozumel in October 2020. Hurricane Grace passed just south of Cozumel in August 2021. In July 2024, Cozumel was placed under a hurricane warning as Hurricane Beryl approached the Yucatán Peninsula.

=== Development of air transportation ===
Work on the original Cozumel airport began when the US needed a stopover to aid World War II planes. While it was able to handle jet aircraft and international flights, it was never a US military base. By 1944, it was only used for emergencies and by the Mexican military. Eventually, Transportes Aeros Mexicanos began using the airport for domestic flights. Cozumel International Airport was built in the late 1970s and expanded in 1999.

== Geography ==
=== Physical geography ===
The island is located in the Caribbean Sea along the eastern side of the Yucatan Peninsula about 82 km (51 mi) south of Cancún and 19 km (12 mi) from the mainland. The island is about 48 km (30 mi) long and 16 km (9.9 mi) wide, with a total area of 477.961 km^{2} (184.542 mi^{2}). It is Mexico's largest Caribbean island, largest permanently inhabited island, and Mexico's third-largest island, following Tiburón Island and Isla Ángel de la Guarda. The population of Cozumel is 88,626 (2020 census). The majority of the island's population lives in the town of San Miguel, which has a population of 84,915 (2020 census).

Cozumel is a municipality which also includes two small areas on the mainland, the ecotourism park of Xel-Ha and the Calica limestone quarry. All combined, Cozumel has a total land area of 647.33 km^{2} (249.94 sq mi).

Large parts of the island are covered with mangrove forest which has many endemic animal species. Cozumel is a flat island based on limestone, resulting in a karst topography. The highest natural point on the island is less than 15 m (49 ft) above sea level. The cenotes are water-filled sinkholes formed by water percolating through the soft limestone soil for thousands of years. Eighteen deep cenotes and more than 250 shallow bodies exist on the island. Many are under dense vegetation. Jade Cavern Cozumel (Cenote Chempita) near El Cedral is often visited by tourists.

=== Climate ===
Cozumel has a tropical savanna climate under the Köppen climate classification that closely borders on a tropical monsoon climate. The dry season is short, from February to April, but even in these months precipitation averages about 45 millimeters (1.8 in) of rain per month. The wet season is lengthy, covering most of the months, with September and October being the wettest, when precipitation averages over 240 millimeters (9.4 in). Thunderstorms can occasionally occur during the wet season. Temperatures tend to remain stable with little variation from month to month, though the temperatures are cooler from December to February. The coolest month, January, averages 22.9 °C (73.2 °F). Owing to its proximity to the sea, the island is fairly humid, with an average humidity of 83%. The wettest recorded month was October 1980, with 792 millimeters (31.2 in) of precipitation and the wettest recorded day was June 19, 1975, with 281 millimeters (11.1 in). Extremes range from 9.2 °C (48.6 °F)—recorded January 18, 1977—to 39.2 °C (102.6 °F).

Climate data for Cozumel (1951–1980)
Month	Jan	Feb	Mar	Apr	May	Jun	Jul	Aug	Sep	Oct	Nov	Dec	Year
Record high °C (°F)	36.4 (97.5)	36.0 (96.8)	34.7 (94.5)	39.0 (102.2)	36.6 (97.9)	36.4 (97.5)	39.2 (102.6)	36.8 (98.2)	36.6 (97.9)	36.1 (97.0)	35.2 (95.4)	32.6 (90.7)	39.2 (102.6)
Mean daily maximum °C (°F)	28.6 (83.5)	29.1 (84.4)	30.9 (87.6)	32.0 (89.6)	32.7 (90.9)	32.4 (90.3)	32.6 (90.7)	33.0 (91.4)	31.9 (89.4)	30.7 (87.3)	29.7 (85.5)	28.6 (83.5)	31.0 (87.8)
Daily mean °C (°F)	22.9 (73.2)	23.2 (73.8)	24.7 (76.5)	26.0 (78.8)	26.9 (80.4)	27.2 (81.0)	27.2 (81.0)	27.2 (81.0)	26.7 (80.1)	25.9 (78.6)	24.8 (76.6)	23.4 (74.1)	25.5 (77.9)
Mean daily minimum °C (°F)	19.4 (66.9)	19.4 (66.9)	20.7 (69.3)	21.8 (71.2)	22.9 (73.2)	23.8 (74.8)	23.5 (74.3)	23.5 (74.3)	23.6 (74.5)	23.1 (73.6)	21.7 (71.1)	20.3 (68.5)	22.0 (71.6)
Record low °C (°F)	9.2 (48.6)	9.7 (49.5)	11.4 (52.5)	14.6 (58.3)	15.2 (59.4)	18.8 (65.8)	17.0 (62.6)	20.8 (69.4)	20.8 (69.4)	17.0 (62.6)	11.2 (52.2)	12.7 (54.9)	9.2 (48.6)
Average precipitation mm (inches)	81.4 (3.20)	60.0 (2.36)	32.2 (1.27)	44.8 (1.76)	110.6 (4.35)	191.7 (7.55)	115.5 (4.55)	141.7 (5.58)	240.2 (9.46)	242.5 (9.55)	122.5 (4.82)	106.8 (4.20)	1,489.9 (58.66)
Average precipitation days (≥ 0.1 mm)	8.66	6.46	4.03	3.73	7.20	12.63	11.83	13.37	15.43	15.70	11.06	9.76	119.86
Average relative humidity (%)	82	81	79	79	80	84	84	84	87	85	83	83	83
Mean monthly sunshine hours	198.0	192.3	232.0	257.0	231.9	206.5	220.1	221.7	181.5	193.7	183.9	192.2	2,510.8
Source: Colegio de Postgraduados

== Environment ==
=== Fauna ===
Cozumel is home to several endemic birds, including the Cozumel emerald, Cozumel great curassow, Cozumel thrasher, Cozumel vireo and Cozumel wren. The Cozumel great curassow is vulnerable, while the Cozumel thrasher is considered nearly, if not already, extinct.

Endemic mammals exhibiting insular dwarfism include the Cozumel fox, which is considered nearly, if not already, extinct; the Cozumel Island coati, which is endangered; and the Cozumel Island raccoon, which is critically endangered.

Three rodents found on Cozumel are larger than their mainland counterparts, an example of island gigantism: Oryzomys couesi, Peromyscus leucopus and Reithrodontomys spectabilis. R. spectabilis is also endemic to Cozumel and is critically endangered.

Other native wildlife includes the Cozumel crocodile, black spiny-tailed iguana and blue land crab (Cardisoma guanhumi). The Cozumel crocodile was initially thought to be a population of the American crocodile, but is now believed to be a separate species. The splendid toadfish is endemic to the waters around Cozumel.

==== Introduced species ====
The boa constrictor is an invasive species on Cozumel.

=== Coral reefs ===
==== Reef system ====
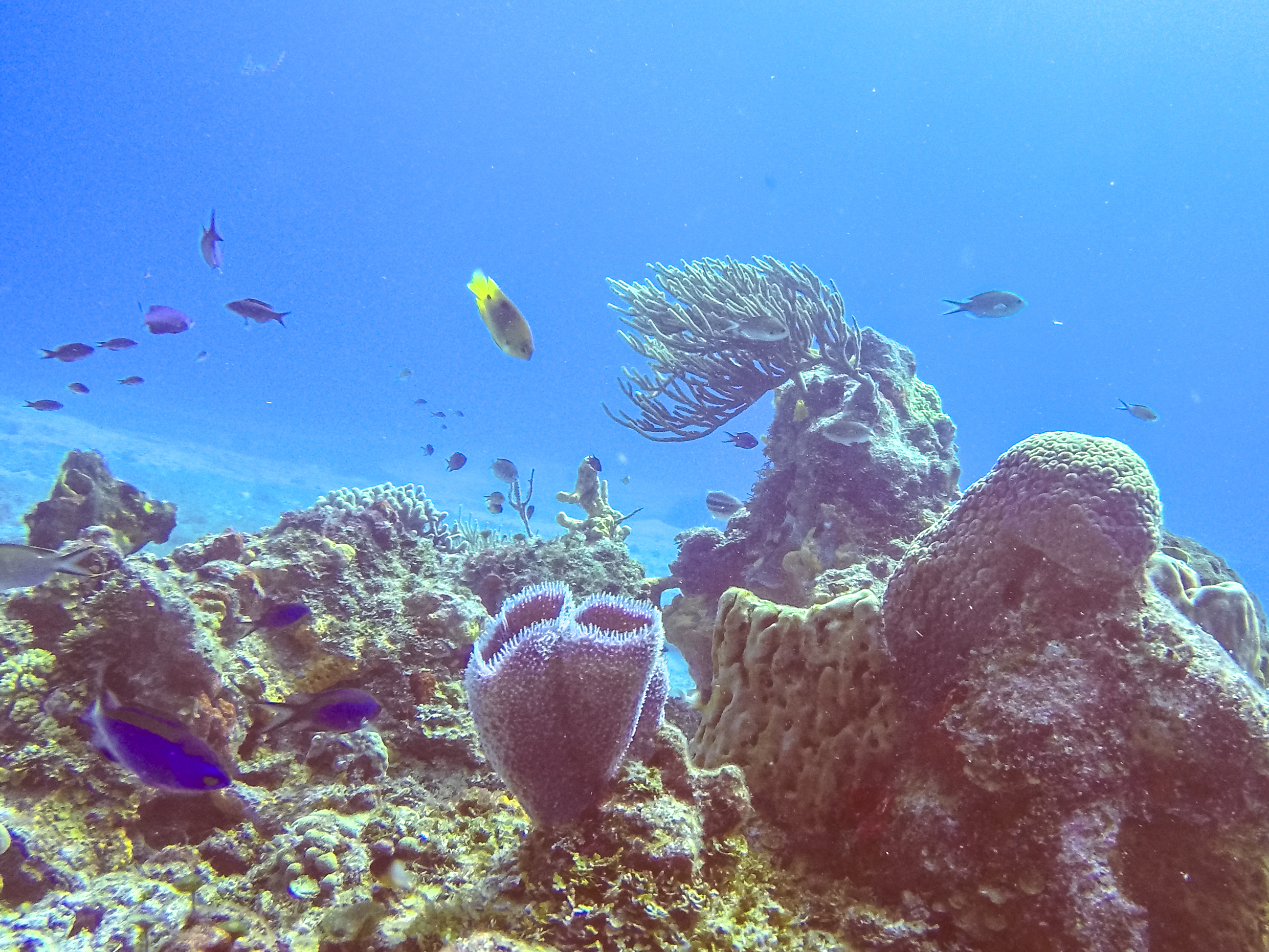
Coral reefs and marine life in Arrecifes de Cozumel National Park

Cozumel is surrounded by a diverse ecosystem of coral reefs that is home to more than 1,000 marine species. The reefs are primarily found on underwater cliffs; some exist in coastal lagoons and on sand bars at the north tip of the island. These reefs are part of the much larger Mesoamerican Barrier Reef System, which is the second largest reef in the world, stretching over 1,000 kilometers (620 mi).

The reefs in Cozumel are made up of hard coral and soft coral. The marine life that inhabit the reefs include zoanthids, polychaetes, actinarians, hydroids, sponges, crustaceans, mollusks, echinoderms, and many varieties of Caribbean fish. The park is also a habitat to several endangered marine species such as the loggerhead sea turtle, hawksbill sea turtle, queen triggerfish, and the endemic splendid toadfish.

==== Threats ====
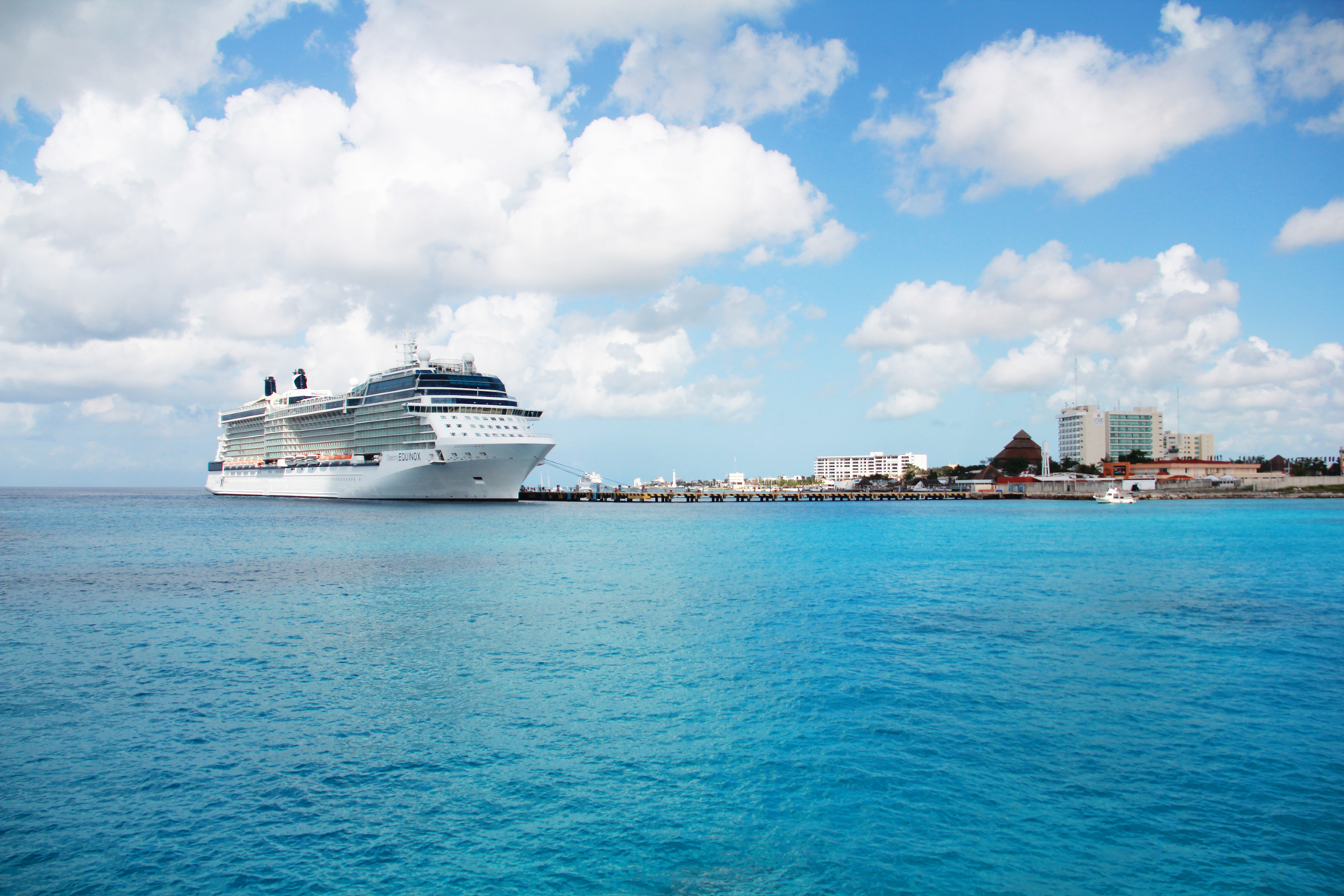
Cruise port in San Miguel de Cozumel; the ship pictured is the Celebrity Equinox.

Cozumel's deeper coral reefs were historically famed for their black corals, yet black coral populations declined from the 1960s to the mid-1990s because of overharvesting and by 2016 had not recovered.

Despite the importance of healthy reefs to Cozumel's tourist trade, a deepwater pier was built in the 1990s for cruise ships to dock, causing damage to the reefs, and it is now a regular stop on cruises in the Caribbean. Over the past few decades, coral reef health has significantly declined in Cozumel, with much lower coral cover now present than was historically recorded.

In 2025, there were plans to build a 4th pier, however this was met with fierce backlash from the local community to prevent further damage to the reefs.

==== Conservation ====
These coral reefs are protected from the open ocean by the island's natural geography. In 1996, the government of Mexico also established the Cozumel Reefs National Marine Park, forbidding anyone from touching or removing any marine life within the park boundaries.

A large portion of the reef on the south side of the island is sectioned off into the Arrecifes de Cozumel National Park. This park is protected under the Ramsar Convention along with Manglares y Humedales del Norte de Isla Cozumel; they both are included in the UNESCO protected area called Isla Cozumel Biosphere Reserve, Mexico.

Since the 1990s, restoration efforts have focused on repairing coral reefs damaged by human activity and improving reef health. The Cozumel Coral Reef Restoration Program, a local non-governmental organization, has worked to restore reefs damaged during the construction of a deepwater pier in the 1990s.

In September 2019, the Arrecifes de Cozumel National Park introduced a rotating reef-rest strategy in response to the spread of stony coral tissue loss disease (also known as "white syndrome"). The strategy temporarily closes selected reefs to tourism and recreational activities, allowing them to recover while supporting scientific monitoring and conservation efforts. The programme remains part of the park's ongoing management of the reef ecosystem.

== Government and administration ==
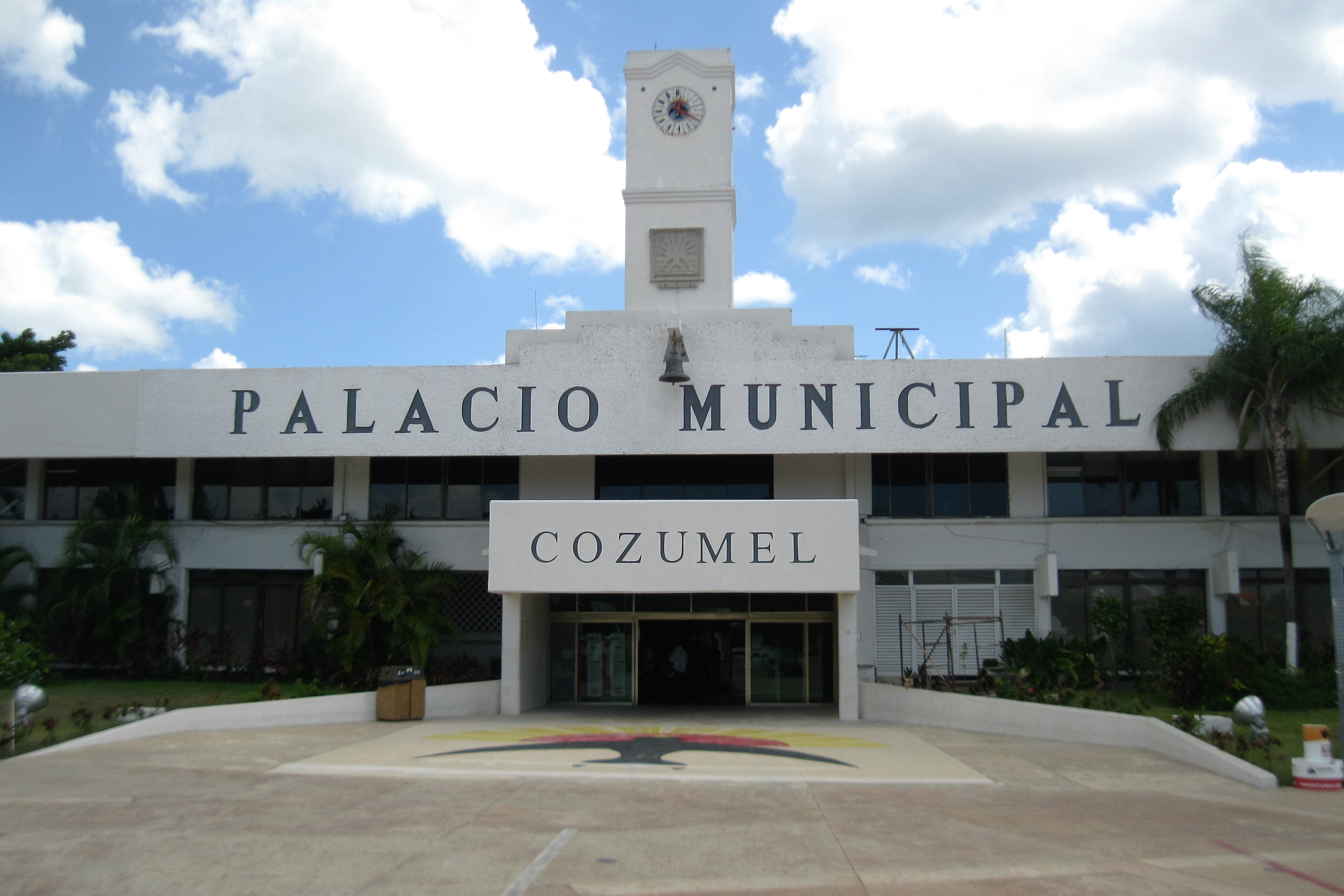
Headquarters of the municipal government of Cozumel, in San Miguel de Cozumel

Cozumel Municipality is one of eleven municipalities of Quintana Roo. The municipal seat is located in San Miguel de Cozumel, the largest city in the municipality.

=== Flag ===
Flag of Cozumel Municipality

The Cozumel flag displays a swallow on a blue and white background. The blue background represents the sea, while the white represents the purity of the Maya. The sun represents the position of the island in the eastern region of the country, and the swallow indicates the meaning of the word Cozumel in the Mayan language. The sword is Spanish and represents the conquest of the island by the Spaniards in 1521.

== Economy ==
=== Tourism ===
The economy of Cozumel is based on tourism, including daily visits from cruise ship passengers, as well as tourists scuba diving, snorkeling, and charter fishing. Some controversy exists over the detrimental effects tourism has on the ecosystem of Cozumel.

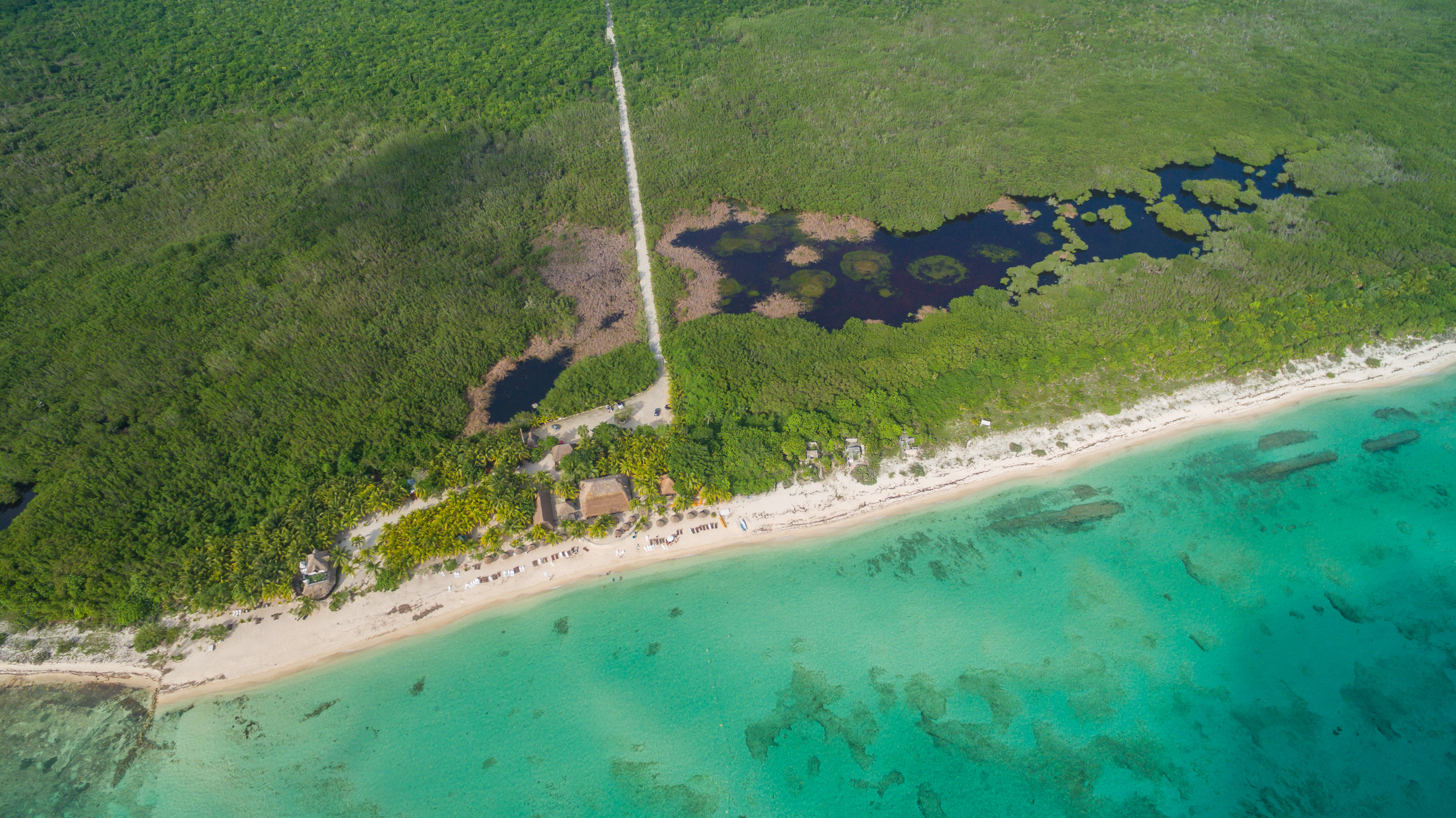
Aerial of Palancar Beach on Cozumel

In addition to restaurants, hotels, and dive shops, vendors near the ports sell a variety of souvenirs and jewelry. All of these contribute greatly to the economy of Cozumel.

Other water activities include para-sailing, kitesurfing, and a tourist submarine. There are also two dolphinariums. The only working pearl farm in the Caribbean is located on the north edge of the island.

San Miguel de Cozumel, the main town on the island, is home to many restaurants with a variety of cuisines, along with several discothèques, bars, cinemas, and outdoor stages. The main plaza is surrounded by shops; in the middle of the plaza is a fixed stage where Cozumeleños (people of Cozumel) and tourists celebrate every Sunday evening with music and dancing.

Due to the abundant marine life and coral reefs, as well as the clear and warm Caribbean water, Cozumel is considered one of the best scuba-diving destinations in the world.

== Transportation ==
=== Water transportation ===
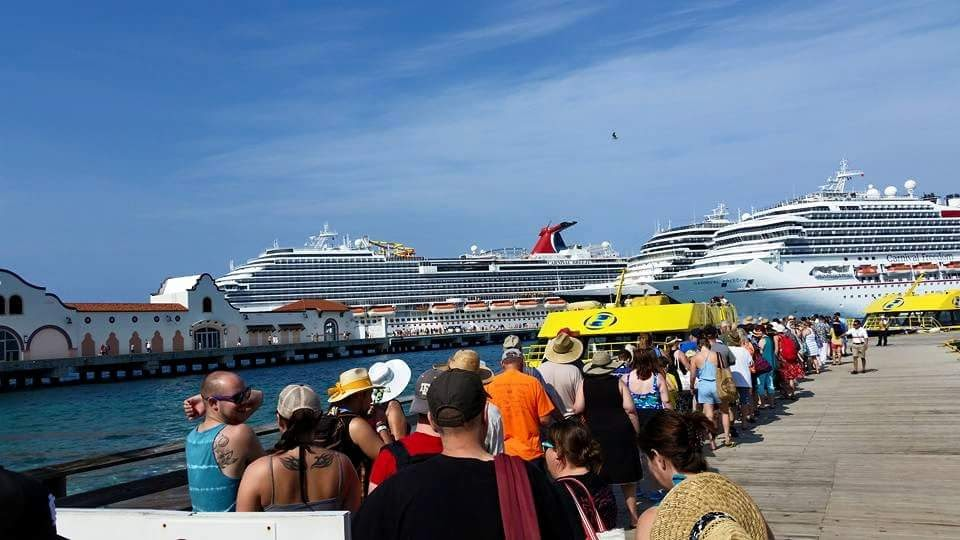
Multiple cruise ships docked in Cozumel. From left to right: Carnival Breeze, unnamed Holland America ship, and Carnival Freedom.

As an island, Cozumel relies on water transportation to connect with mainland Mexico. Its principal port infrastructure consists of five piers. Punta Langosta, Puerta Maya and the International Pier serve cruise ships. The Fiscal Pier (Muelle Fiscal) in San Miguel de Cozumel provides passenger ferry service to and from Playa del Carmen and also serves as a landing point for passengers arriving from cruise ships anchored offshore. A cargo and vehicle ferry terminal south of downtown is used by ferries transporting freight and automobiles between Cozumel and the mainland.

Passenger ferries provide a link between Cozumel and the mainland for residents and visitors. Cargo and vehicle ferries transport freight and automobiles, while the island's cruise terminals serve cruise ships.

== Culture ==
=== Santa Cruz Festival and El Cedral Fair ===
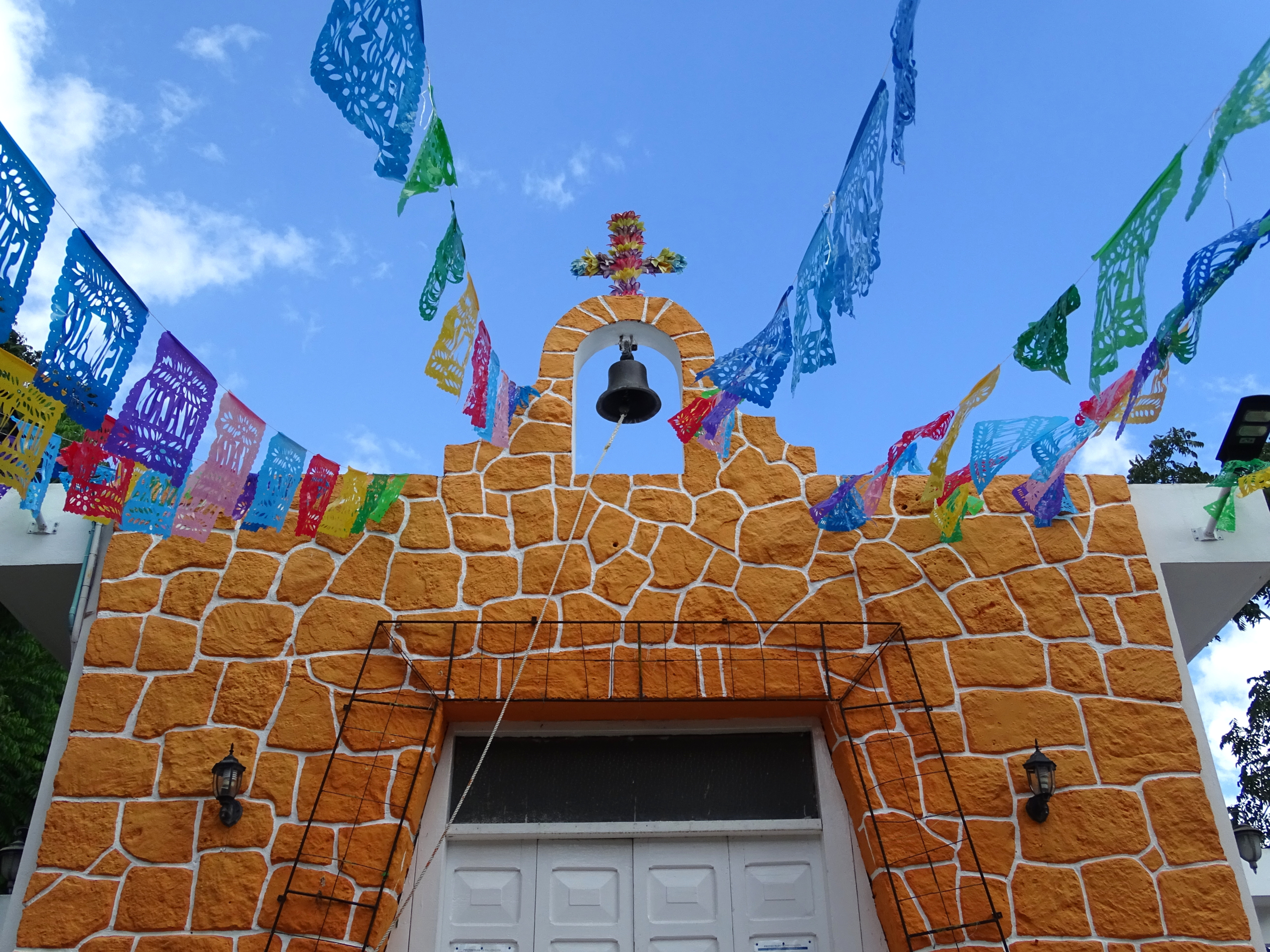
El cedral

The Festival of Santa Cruz and El Cedral Fair is a historical tradition held in the town of El Cedral, in the south of Cozumel Island at the end of April. This annual event is said to have been started over 150 years ago by Casimiro Cárdenas. Cárdenas was one of a group that fled to the island from the village of Saban, on the mainland, after an attack during the Caste War of Yucatán in 1848. The attackers killed other villagers, but Cárdenas survived while clutching a small wooden cross.

Legend has it that Cárdenas vowed to start an annual festival wherever he settled, to honor the religious power of this crucifix. Today, the original Holy Cross (Santa Cruz) Festival forms part of the wider Festival of El Cedral, which includes fairs, traditional feasts, rodeos, bullfights, music and competitions. The celebrations last about five days in all and are held every year at the end of April or beginning of May.

=== Cozumel Carnival ===
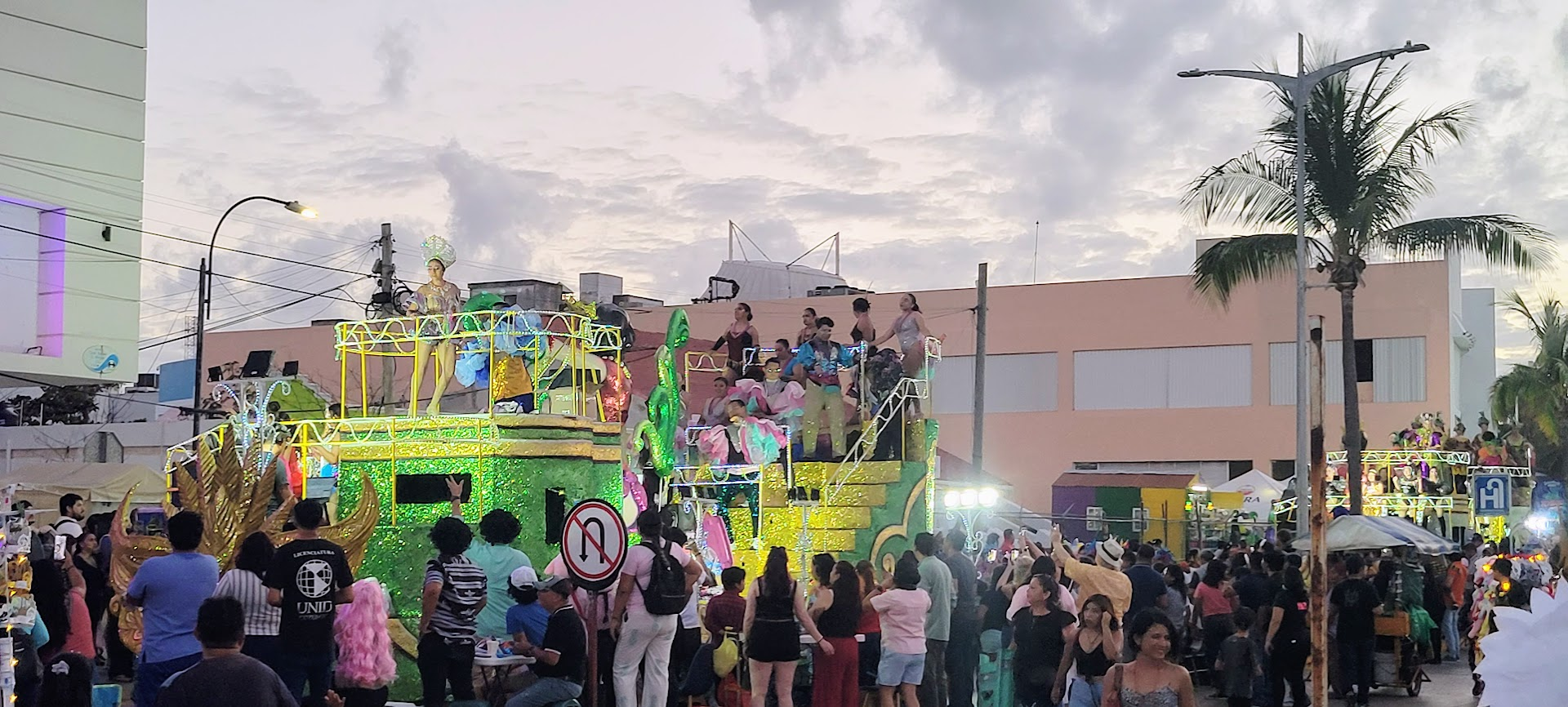
The parade during Cozumel Carnival 2024

The Cozumel Carnival or Carnaval de Cozumel is one of the most important carnival festivities in México. It has been celebrated as a tradition beginning from the late nineteenth century and fills Cozumel's streets with parades. It begins the week before Mardi-Gras in February. Cozumel's Carnival is a tradition which has been passed down through many generations that celebrates a mixture of cultures that escaped to the warm embrace of Cozumel. Dating back to the mid-1800s, Cozumel Carnaval was started by young people dressed in vibrantly colorful costumes known as "Estudiantinas" or "Comparsas", who expressed themselves in the streets of Cozumel through the artforms of dance, song, and fantasy.

== Education ==
There are three universities on the island: the State Public University of Quintana Roo (UQROO) and two private universities, the Partenon Institute and the Interamerican University for Development (UNID). In addition to teaching English as a degree program, they offer other career options including natural resources research, tourism and commercial systems. The Cozumel Arts University offers artist education at the bachelor's level.

== In popular culture ==
- Cozumel is one of the locations featured in the 2006 video game Tom Clancy's Splinter Cell: Double Agent.
- Cozumel and its Mayan ruins are featured in the program I Shouldn't Be Alive Season 6, Episode 5: "Lost In The Jungle".
- Cozumel is one of the locations featured in the 2018 video game Shadow of the Tomb Raider.
- Cozumel is featured as one of the primary settings and filming locations of the 1984 film, Against All Odds.
- In the 1995 film, The Net , Cozumel is a set as the place where lead actress Sandra Bullock goes on holiday.

== See also ==
- Cozumel Port
