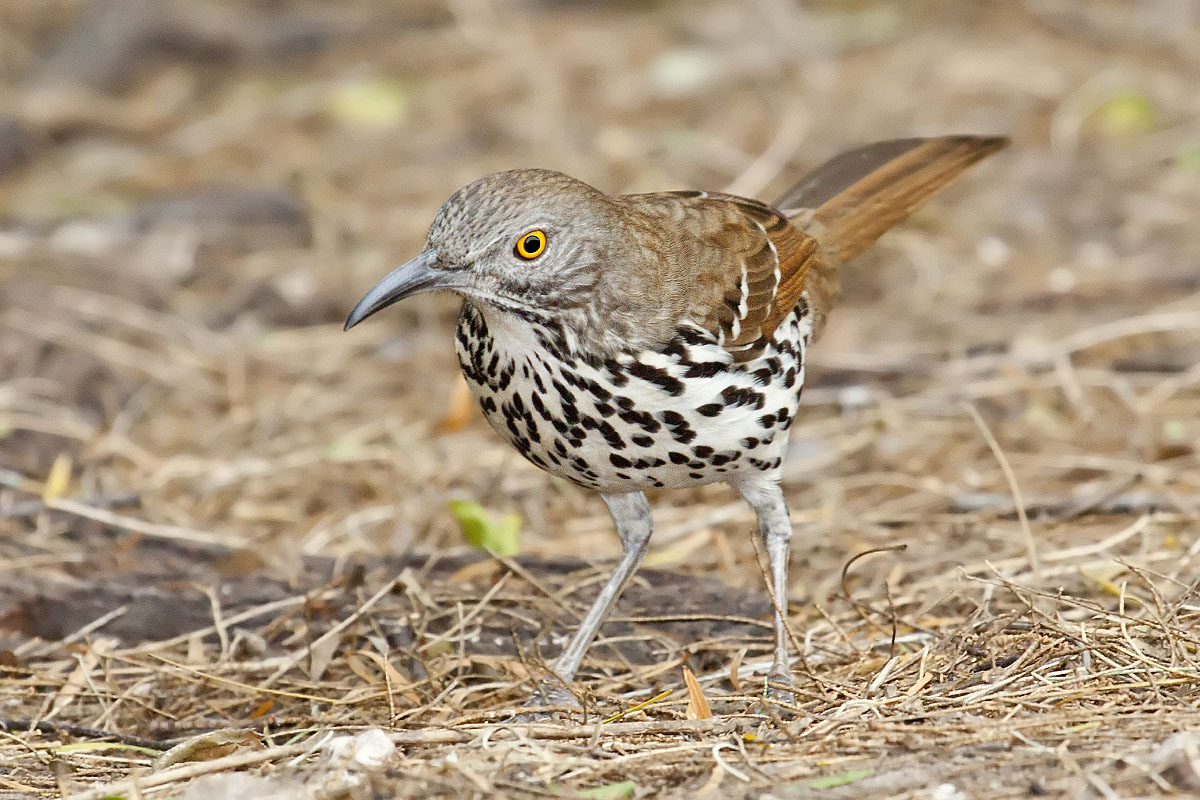
- at Laguna Atascosa National Wildlife Refuge, Texas

Conservation status
- Least Concern (IUCN 3.1)

Scientific classification
- Kingdom: Animalia
- Phylum: Chordata
- Class: Aves
- Order: Passeriformes
- Family: Mimidae
- Genus: Toxostoma
- Species: T. longirostre

Binomial name
- Toxostoma longirostre (Lafresnaye, 1838)
- Long-billed thrasher range

Synonyms
- Orpheus longirostris

= Long-billed thrasher =

Species of bird

The long-billed thrasher (Toxostoma longirostre) is a medium-sized resident songbird of South Texas and eastern Mexico. It bears a strong resemblance to its close relative the brown thrasher in appearance, calls, and various other behaviors; however, the two species do not overlap in range except in the winter when the brown thrasher will temporarily reside in the northern range of the long-billed.

The bird is a large sized mimid that is not especially wary, but it will take precautionary measures to prevent itself from being potential prey. Like other thrashers, it is named after its sweeping methods when searching for food, not for thrashing predators, although they are aggressive defenders of their territories.

== Taxonomy ==
The specific name longirostre is derived from the Latin words longus long and rostrum bill.

There are two subspecies of the long-billed thrasher. T. longirostre ssp. longirostre was first described in scientific literature by Frédéric de Lafresnaye in 1838 as Orpheus longirostris, while T. longirostre ssp. sennitti was described by Robert Ridgway a half-century later.

T. longirostre ssp. longirostre (Lafresnaye, 1838). Range is in eastern Mexico, within the states of Querétaro, Tamaulipas and Veracruz southward to Puebla.

T. longirostre ssp. sennitti (Ridgway, 1888), known as Sennett's thrasher. Range extends from southern (particularly south central) Texas to the Rio Grande Valley and the Mexican states of Tamaulipas and San Luis Potosi.

Along with the brown thrasher and Cozumel thrasher, the three are part of a superspecies rufum clade. Plumage patterns and bill shapes were originally used for grouping, and the birds also were shown as closely related with genetic studies.

== Description ==
This bird is slender and long-tailed, averaging 26.5–29 cm (10.5–11.5 in) in length and about 70 g (2.5 oz) in weight. It is a large-sized thrasher that is close in size to the American robin.

T. longirostre ssp. sennitti is described with a grayish-brown crown with a rufous color appearing in the back, rump, rear, and shoulder. Broad white tips located on the greater and lesser primary coverts and dullish-brown with rufous brown edges on the primary and secondary coverts gives the closed wings a rufous appearance. The chin, throat, chest, and belly can appear to be white or a pale-buffy white, although the chest and belly contain keenly blackish oval shapes. The underwing is buffy-white. The iris is typically either orange or orange-yellow, with a dull brown bill with its base of the lower mandible appear to be pinkish grey. T. longirostre ssp. longirostre is similar with an exception to being smaller, darker, and has a red-tinged appearance with buffy-white underparts.

Juveniles have dusty streak marks on its rump, with buffy-white undertail coverts.

=== Similar species ===
This thrasher shares a striking resemblance with the brown thrasher. However, there are a number of differences. Its face is more gray in contrast to the reddish appearance of the thrasher. The underparts are whiter, less buffy, and more robustly colored, an eye that appears more orange and beady, and generally a longer-bill that is blacker and stands apart from the face. The long-billed's overall appearance has more contrasts in its pattern in comparison to the brown thrasher.

The sage thrasher, which shares some its distribution with the long-billed, is smaller, grayer, and its rectrices are of a more distinguished white color.

== Distribution and habitat ==
This species is a resident in southern Texas north to San Antonio and Aransas County, south through north-western Mexico to central Veracruz, east to eastern Coahuila, San Luis Potosí and Hidalgo. The breeding density is at the highest among the Rio Grande Valley. Although it is a resident in the lower Rio Grande Valley, a significant amount of its habitat was destroyed for agricultural purposes, and its population in the area decreased from the 1930s to the 1970s. Some human activity that has introduced appropriate habitat is thought to have been some help the species, and it is still is a common resident within its range. In Texas there is some evidence of a northern and eastern expansion of the range over a five decade span (1957-2007), with climate change as the suggested cause. With the exception of vagrants found in New Mexico and Colorado, the species is a permanent resident of its range.

== Behavior ==
Long-billed thrashers usually stay hidden on or near the ground, though it may sing from conspicuous perches. Whenever it searches for insects on the ground, it will energetically turn over ("thrashing") leaves and other litter. It also can be spotted singing on exposed perches above its thornbush fortresses. Males generally are spotted singing from March until the mid-summer, excluding instances of singing song snatches periodically to balance the year. It is generally not wary, possibly because is not easily approached. The flights of the long-billed are generally close to the ground, short, erratic with exaggerated fluctuations. Long-billed thrashers are staunch defenders of their territories; it will defend its nest ferociously, including against humans.

The longest recorded lifespan of the species was one individual recovered on 30 September 1965, at age 7 years and 3 months, after being banded (on 24 Aug 1959) in Alamo, TX.

=== Voice ===
The song is warbling and resembles other thrashers' songs but is especially rich and musical, though occasionally scratchy. Phrases are often repeated two to four times. A distinctive call is a "loud, rich whistle cleeooeep" or "mellow, whistled tweeooip or ooeh"; other calls include "a loud sharp chak" and "a very rapid, sharp rattle chtttr", and tsuck and verrs sounds during territorial disputes that resemble calls of its close relative the brown thrasher.

=== Breeding ===
The general nesting habitat of long-billed thrashers is amongst dense vegetation with spiny shrubs and trees in order to make the nest inaccessible to potential predators. Nests have also been found in plants such as willows, mesquite, huisache, cacti, or yucca.

The nest is a bulky cup placed in thick low or mid-height vegetation and made of materials such as twigs, straws, and grasses. The female lays 2 to 5 eggs described as bluish-white with dense reddish-brown and gray speckles; the appearance is indistinguishable from the brown thrasher. Most of the egg laying for the long-billed in Texas occurs in April and May, and May and June in Mexico, though dates have been as late as June and July, respectively. The eggs hatch over a period of 24 days. Unlike most thrashers, however, the hatching process is synchronous. Both parents are responsible for incubation, which lasts 13 or 14 days as well as feeding the fledglings. They are rarely victims of brood parasitism by the brown-headed cowbird or bronzed cowbird.

=== Feeding ===
In order to locate food, it forages on the ground by rapidly sweeping its bill from side to side tossing leaf-litter upwards and behind itself, then goes to scratching the ground for food. Their diet consists of invertebrates such as grasshoppers, beetles, and other insects, crustaceans, gastropods, and an adequate amount of vegetable matter, especially berries.

== Gallery ==
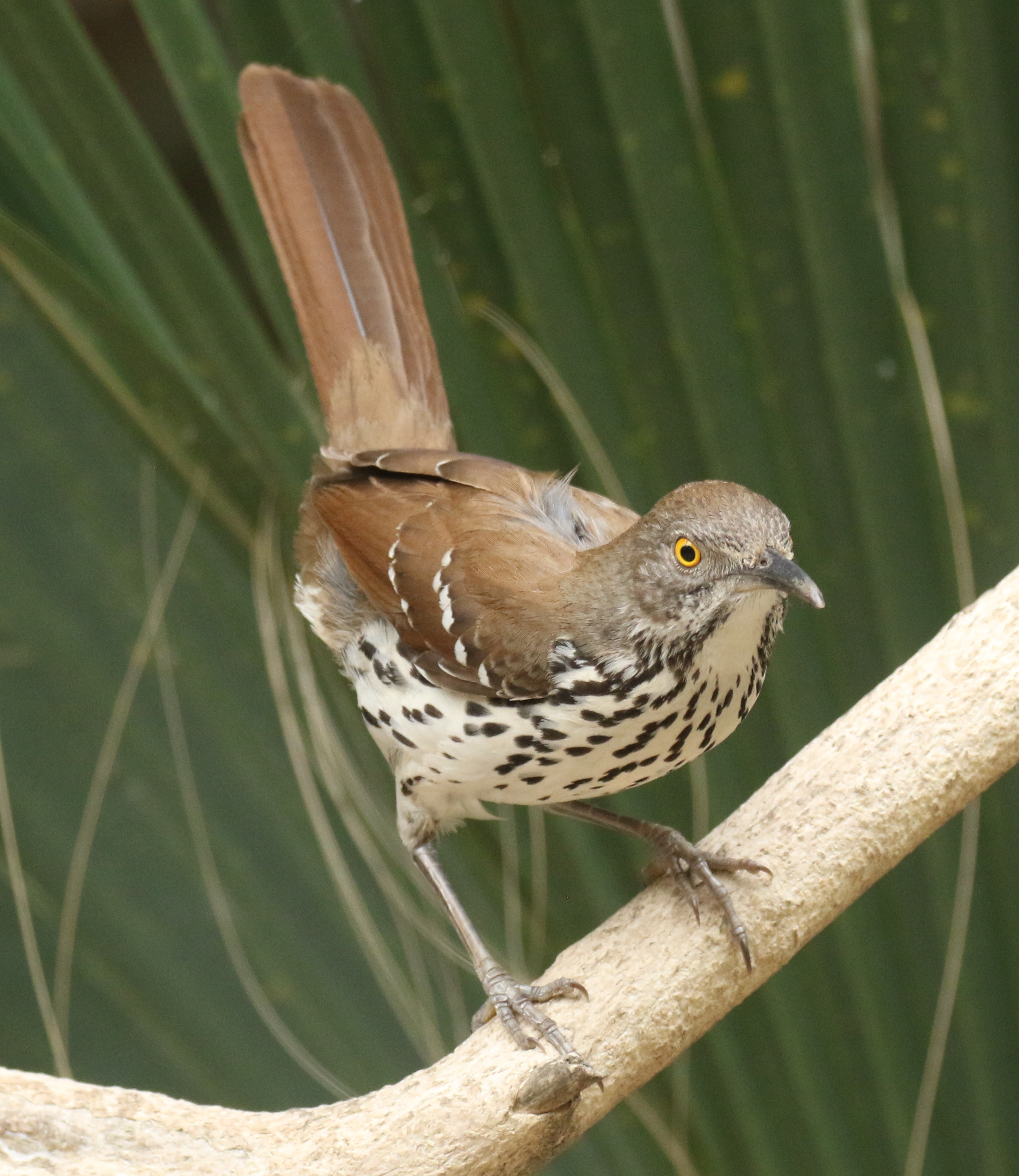
Long-billed thrasher, South Padre Island, Texas

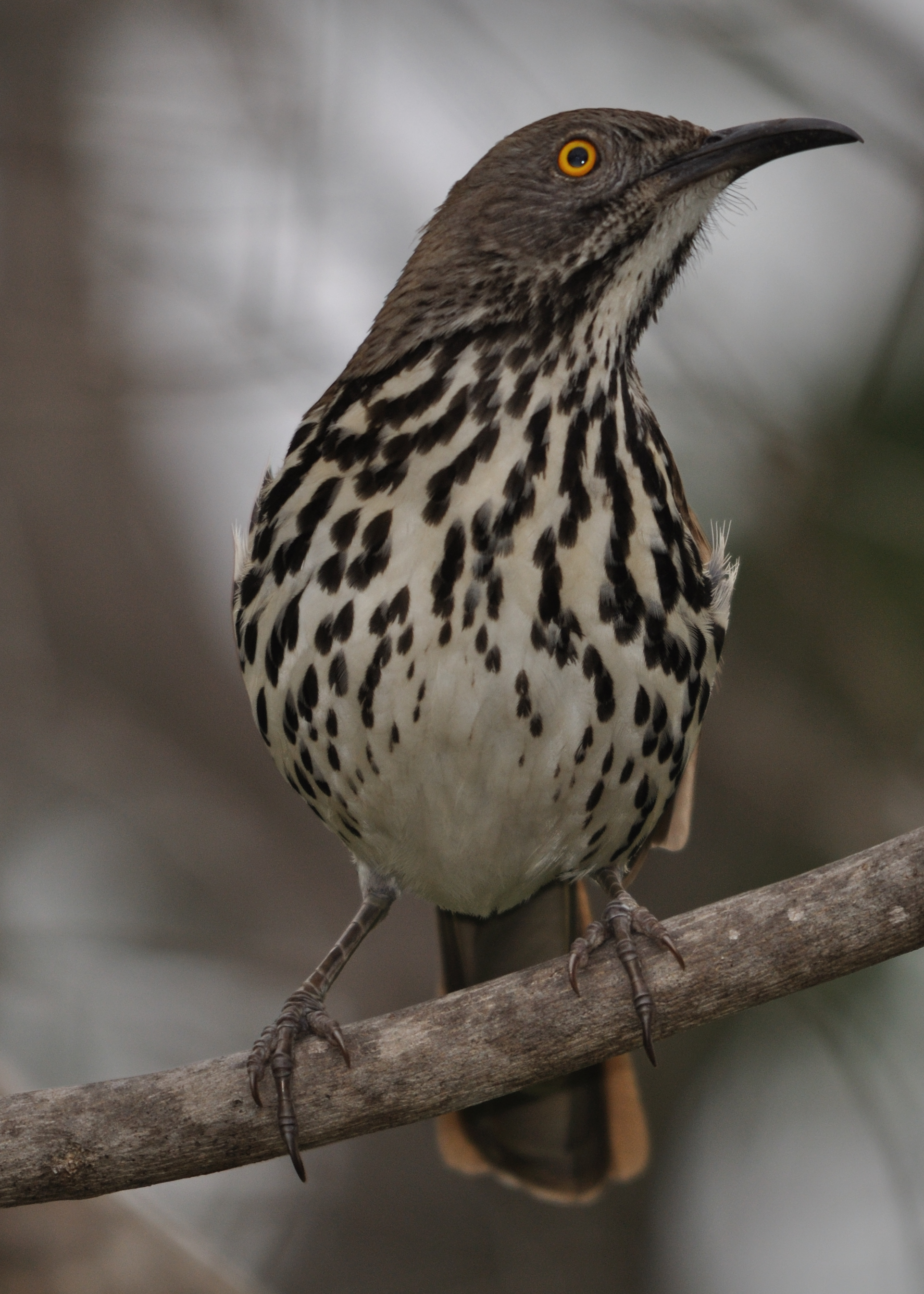
In Texas, United States

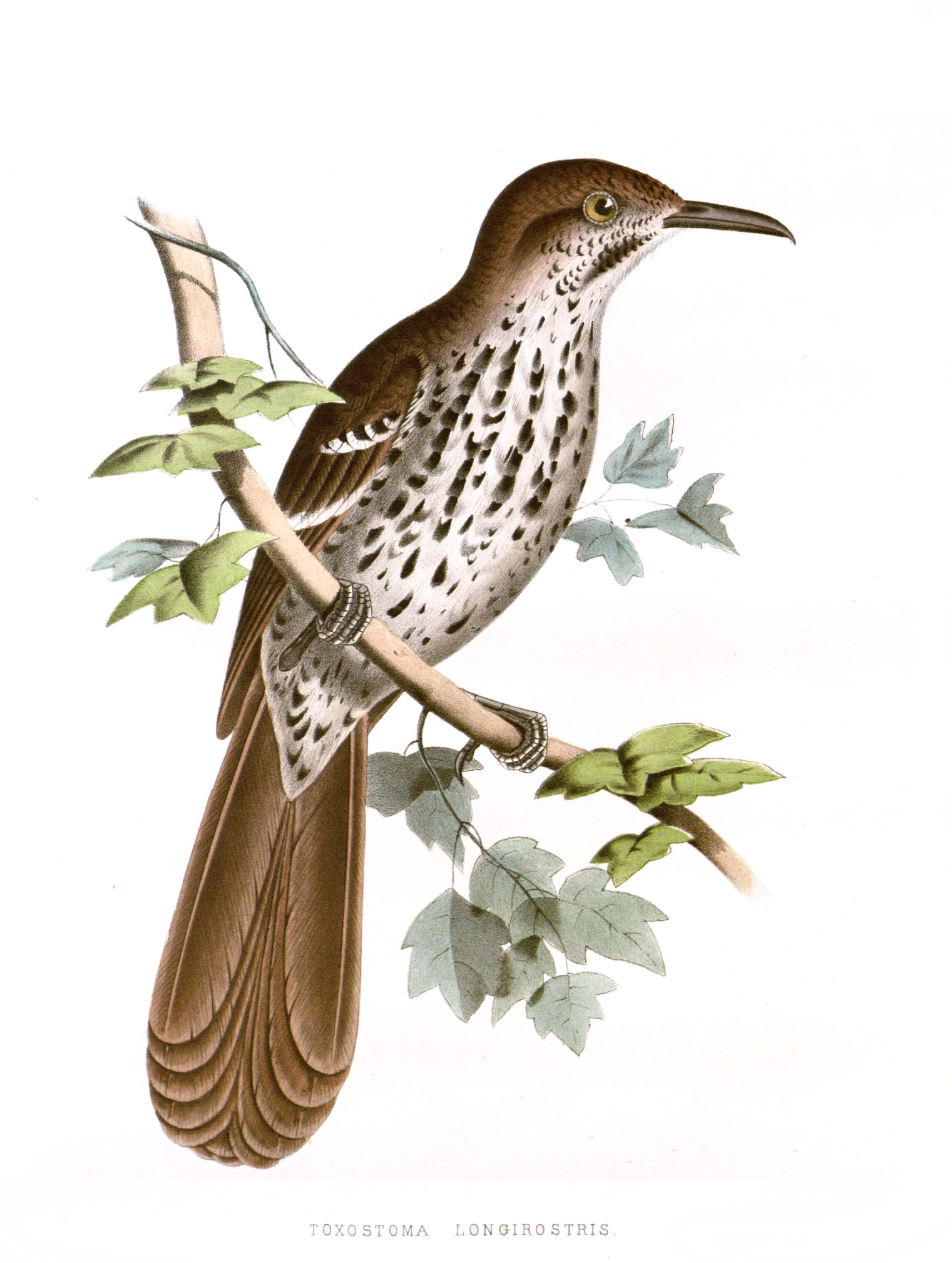
Painting by Spencer F. Baird (1860) of adult T. l. senetti (from the United States and Mexican Boundary Survey)
