= Cozumel Carnival =

Carnival in Mexico

Carnival of Cozumel
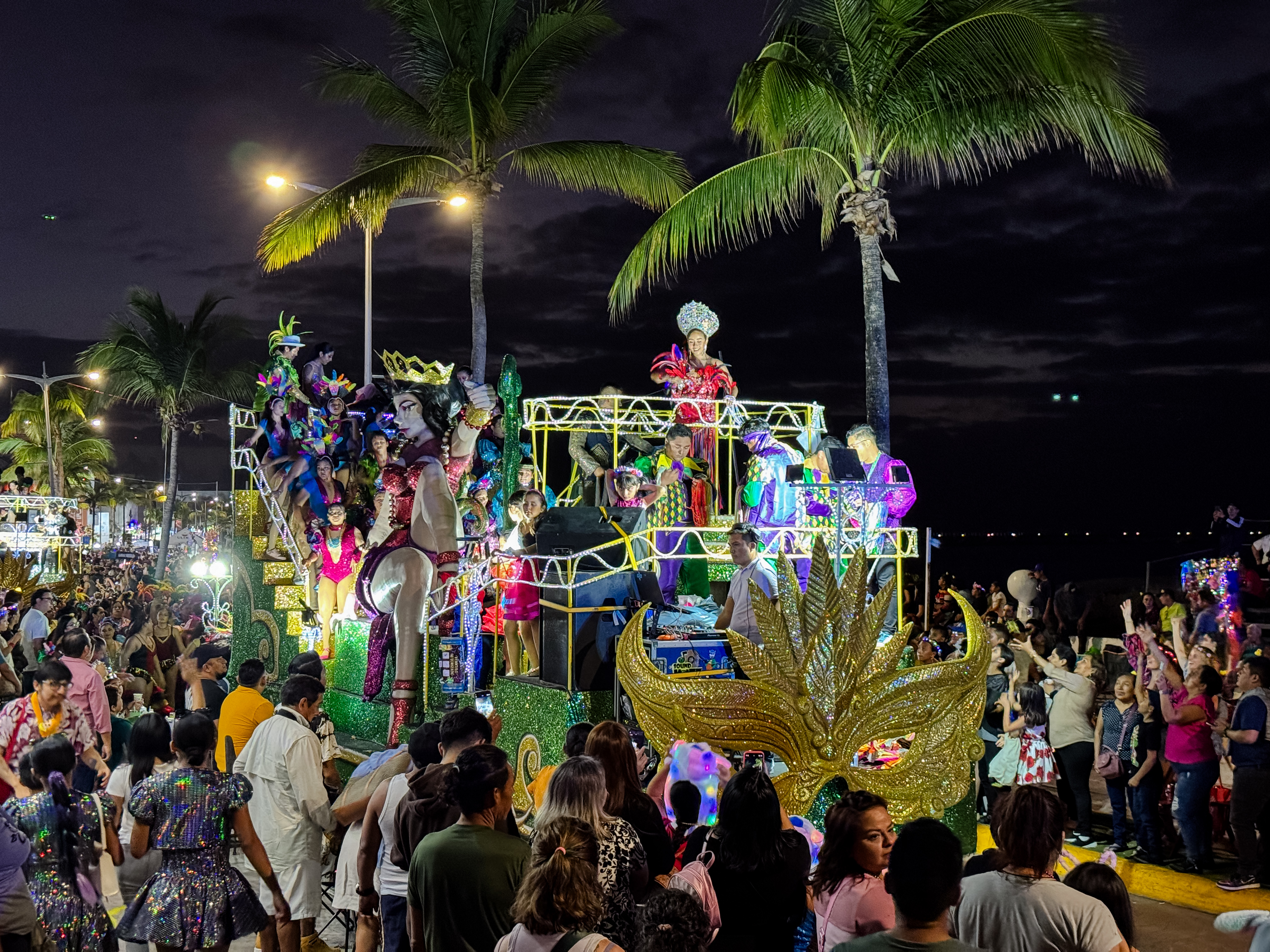
- A parade float at the 2024 Carnival
- Native name: Carnaval de Cozumel
- English name: Cozumel Carnival
- Location: Cozumel
- Type: carnival
- Website: (archived) https://web.archive.org/web/20160503170438/http://www.carnavalcozumel.com.mx/

Cozumel Carnival (Spanish: Carnaval de Cozumel) is one of the top carnivals in Mexico. It is held within the Corridor Riviera Maya – Cozumel – Cancún.

The carnival celebrated its 150-year anniversary in 2024, making it one of the oldest in the country. It is, with the Carnival of Campeche, the only one that has preserved traditional expressions of historical value in the Yucatán Peninsula, and has become an event of heritage for the state of Quintana Roo. It is distinguished by its long history, its cultural aspects, its organization, and its family character.

== First historical references ==
The city chronicler Velio Vivas Valdes and researcher Ric Hajovsky agree that a small book published in St. Louis, Missouri, Powell & Maynard in 1874 is the first historical reference to the Cozumel Carnival.

Author Claude Luther Goodrich Noble, originally from New York, lived on the island for six months in 1873; on his return to the United States in 1874 he published his memoirs on the short time he had lived in Cozumel, mentioning the 1873 Carnival:

"All Classes Ages Are Fond of Music, Dancing, Gambling a Little, feast-day sports, the recurrence of which are frequent, the Innocent revelry of the pastories, the parade and pomp of the Carnival. The guitar and violin, bugle and drums are most of the musical instruments, and all these are sadly out of repair ¡No piano or organ has ever yet been taken to the island!".

The second-oldest historical reference of this celebration is a notice in the journal "Merida", published on March 30 and April 20, 1876 by Nestor Rubio Alpuche, announcing the beginning of carnival activities on the island. According to later oral history, in 1896 the dances in carnival costumes and the "Danza de las cintas" and wooden bull "Huacax-Che" appeared as expressions of carnival.

In 1908 formal permission was first applied for from the island authorities for a formal dance carnival. The applicant for the permit was José Azueta, who paid four pesos for a permit for a dance for young ladies, and 1 peso and 50 cents for a permit for mestizas.
