= San Miguel de Cozumel =

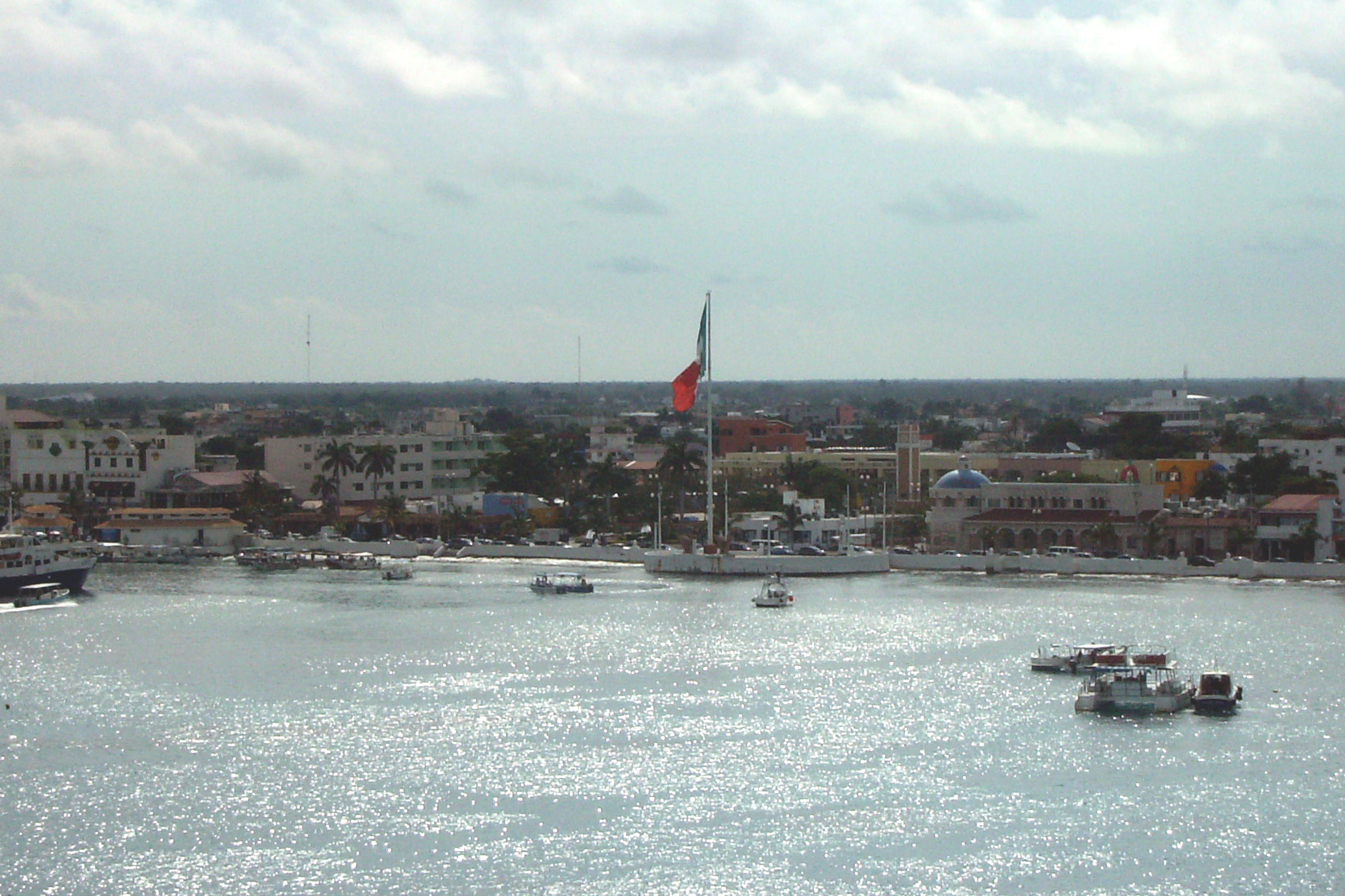
- Aerial view of San Miguel de Cozumel

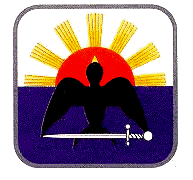
- Coat of arms

- Location within Cozumel Location within Quintana Roo Location within Mexico
- Coordinates: 20°30′37.58″N 86°56′57.30″W
- Country: Mexico
- State: Quintana Roo
- Municipality: Cozumel
- Elevation: 1 m (3.3 ft)

Population
  - City: 77,236
  - Urban: 77,236
- Demonym: Cozumeleño(a)
- Time zone: UTC−5 (Southeast (US Eastern))
- Codigo Postal: 77600
- Area code: 987
- Website: http://www.cozumel.gob.mx/

San Miguel de Cozumel, Commonly known as San Miguel (Spanish pronunciation: [sam miˈɣel de kosuˈmel]) is the largest city in Cozumel Municipality in the Mexican state of Quintana Roo. With a 2010 census population of 77,236, it is also Quintana Roo's fourth-largest community, after Cancún, Chetumal, and Playa del Carmen. It is a hub for tourism on the Riviera Maya, providing the sole ferries between the Mexican mainland and the island. In addition to the ferry service to Playa del Carmen, the first international cruise terminal in Quintana Roo is located in the city.

== Port ==
The Cozumel International Seaport has an international cruise wharf of 271 meters and a dolphin at 45 meters, giving it the ability to receive two cruise ships at once: the exterior band can receive voyager class ships of 140,000 displacement tons, and the interior band can receive ships up to 85,000 displacement tons.

A tender wharf is used to receive minor boats at the terminal.

The types of vessels regularly calling at COZUMEL are Passenger Ship (49%), Sailing Vessel (20%), Pleasure Craft (19%), Passenger (3%), Ro-Ro/Passenger Ship (1%). The maximum length of the vessels recorded to having entered this port is 363 meters. The maximum draught is 9.4 meters. The maximum Deadweight is 28414t.

Cozumel is the 4th world passenger port, by traffic (3,3 million).

== Gallery ==
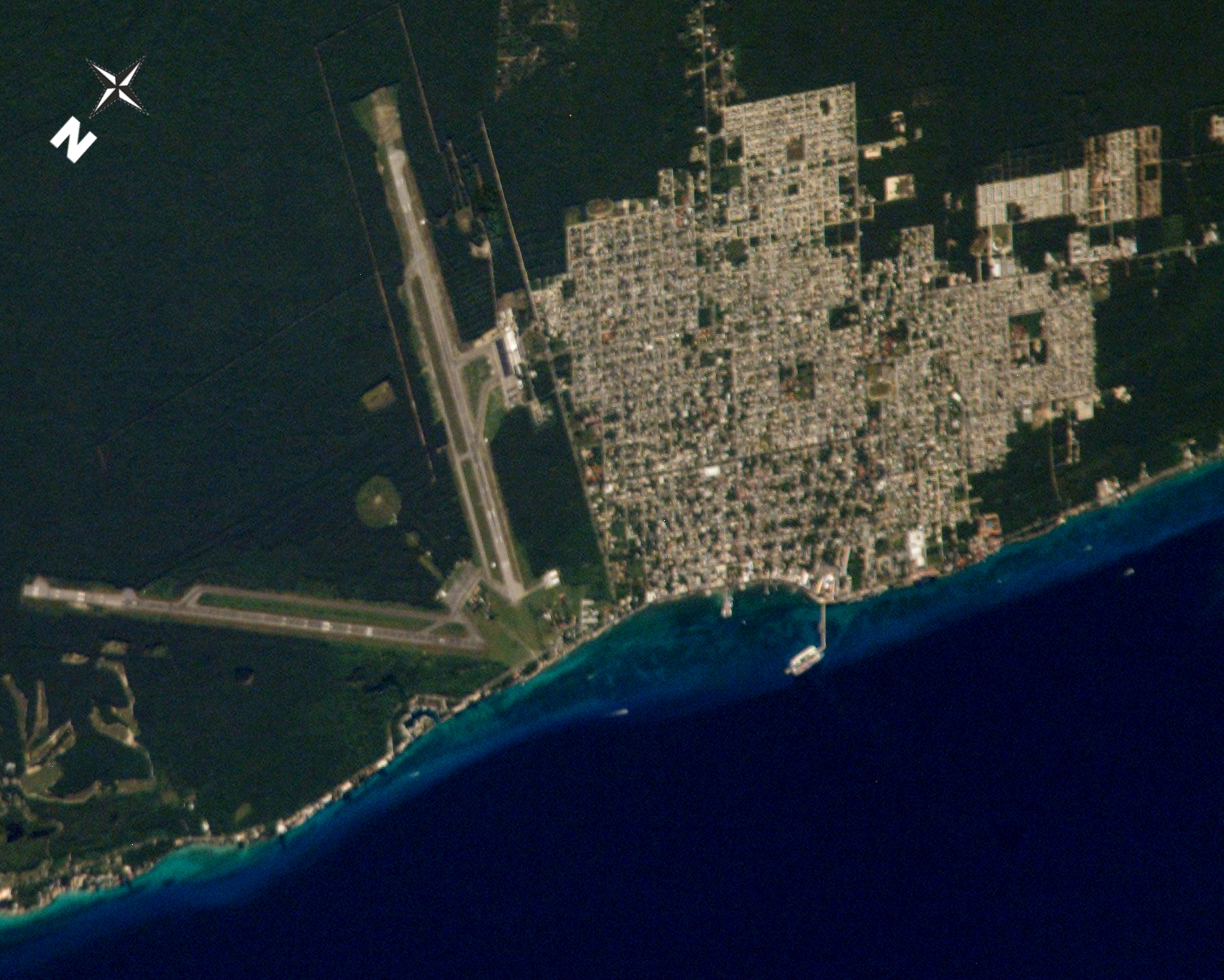
San Miguel de Cozumel satellite image

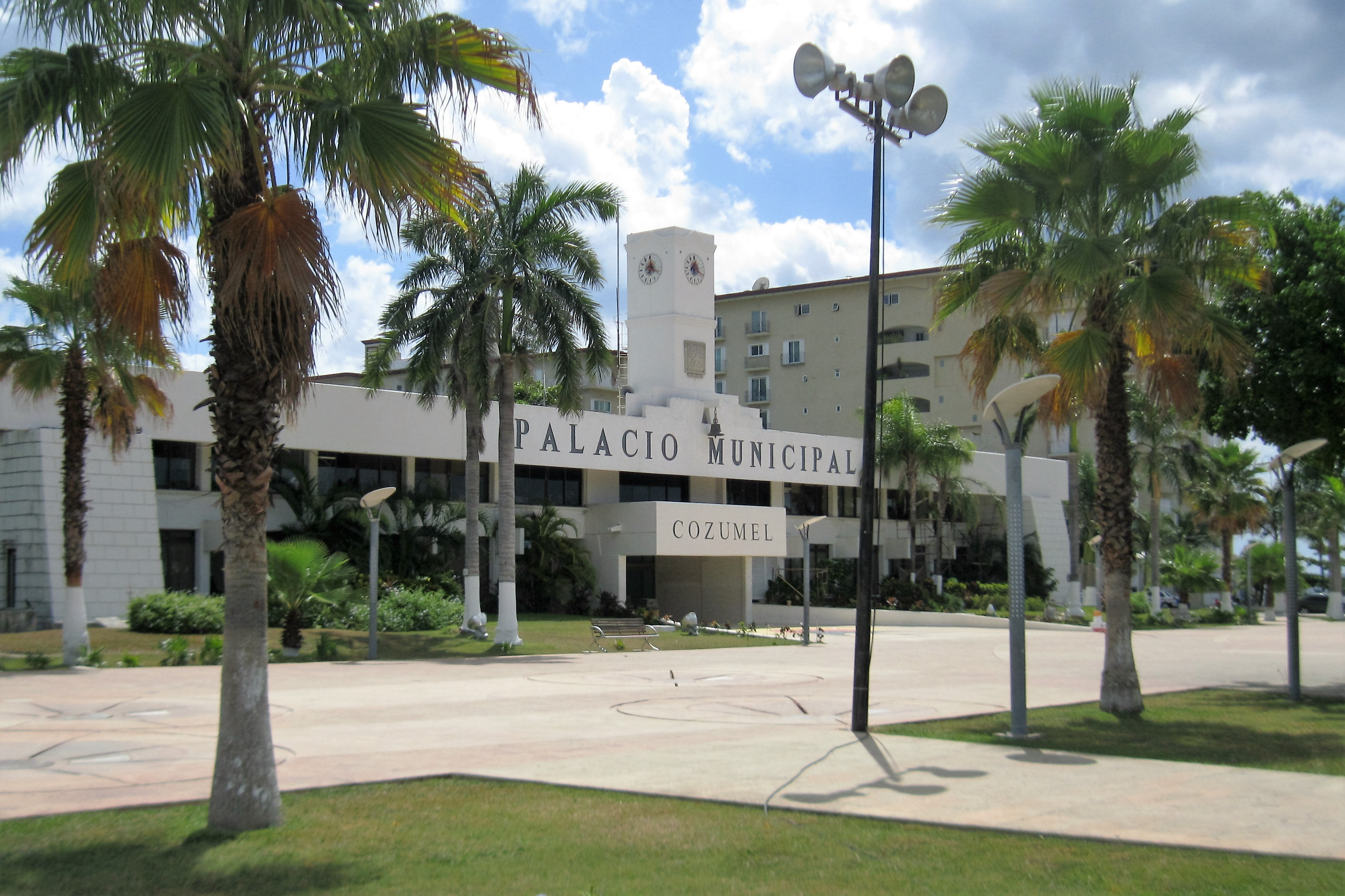
Palacio Municipal in San Miguel de Cozumel, Cozumel, Mexico

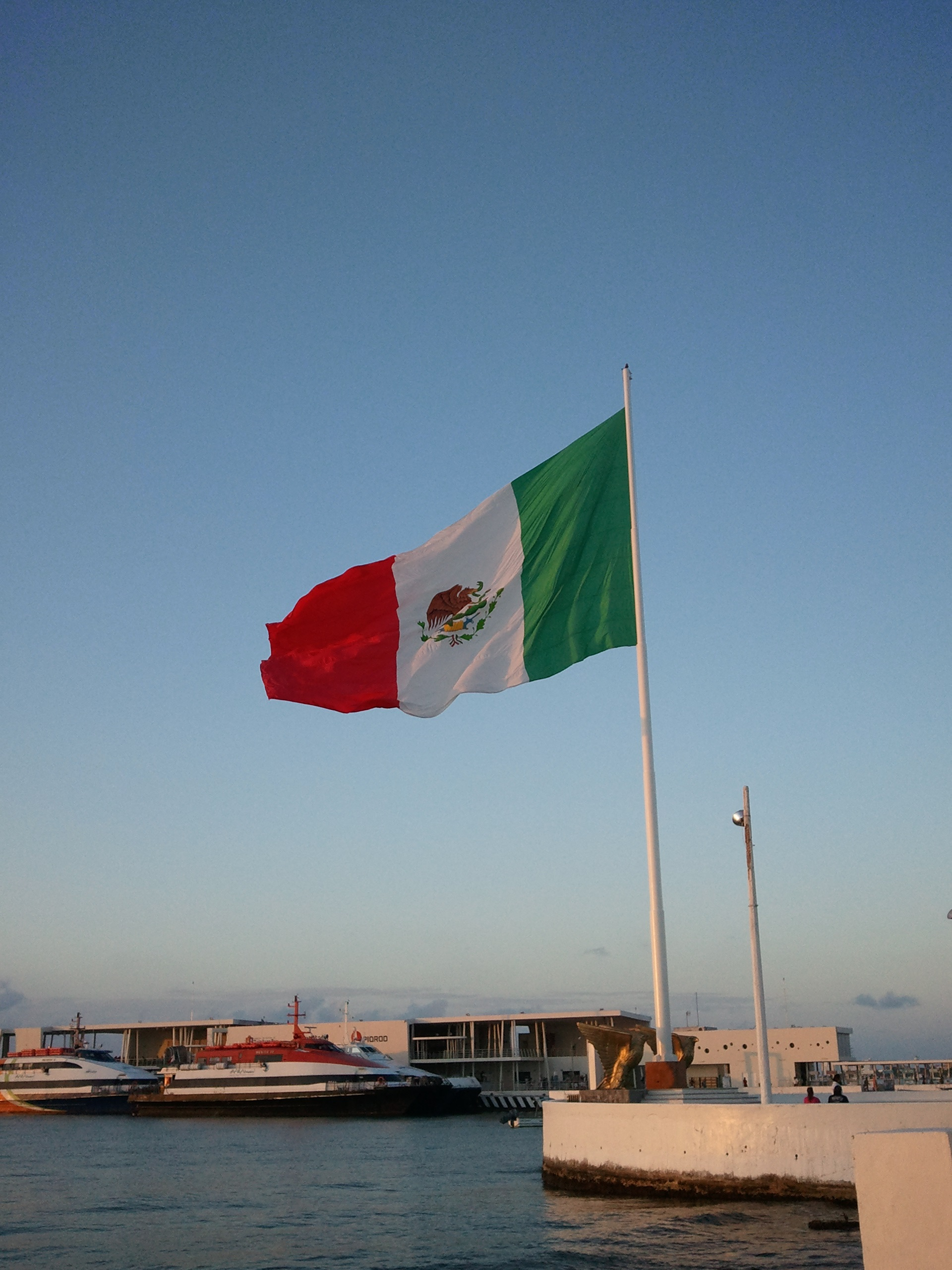
Bandera monumental in San Miguel de Cozumel

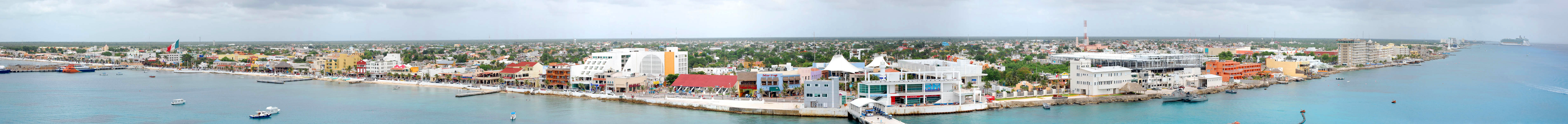
Panoramic View of San Miguel de Cozumel
