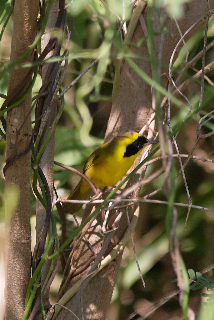
- Male
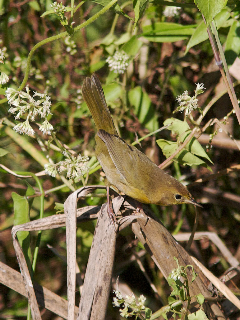
- Female

Conservation status
- Near Threatened (IUCN 3.1)

Scientific classification
- Kingdom: Animalia
- Phylum: Chordata
- Class: Aves
- Order: Passeriformes
- Family: Parulidae
- Genus: Geothlypis
- Species: G. flavovelata

Binomial name
- Geothlypis flavovelata Ridgway, 1896

= Altamira yellowthroat =

Species of bird

The Altamira yellowthroat (Geothlypis flavovelata) is a New World warbler. It is a resident breeding bird endemic to the Gulf slope of north-eastern Mexico.

== Taxonomy ==
It is closely related to common yellowthroat, Belding's yellowthroat, and Bahama yellowthroat, with which it forms a superspecies. It has been considered conspecific with these species.

== Description ==
The Altamira yellowthroat is 13 cm (5.1 in) long and has a yellow-green back and bright yellow belly. The adult male has a black face mask and yellow crown. Females are similar, but lack the black mask and have an olive crown. This species is easily distinguished from wintering common yellowthroats by its uniform yellow underparts, in contrast to common's white belly. Males' yellow forehead bands are diagnostic.

Vocalizations are very similar to those of common yellowthroat and are not readily distinguishable to the human ear. Altamira and common yellowthroats, however, do not respond to tapes of one another's songs.

== Ecology and behaviour ==
The species is resident in freshwater marshes (including canals and drainage ditches), especially those with cattails. Little is known of its breeding or feeding habits, but other yellowthroats build a cup nest low in vegetation and feed on insects, usually captured in dense vegetation, so it is likely that the Altamira yellowthroat does the same.

== Conservation and threats ==
There has been a decline in numbers of this localized bird due to loss of habitat.
