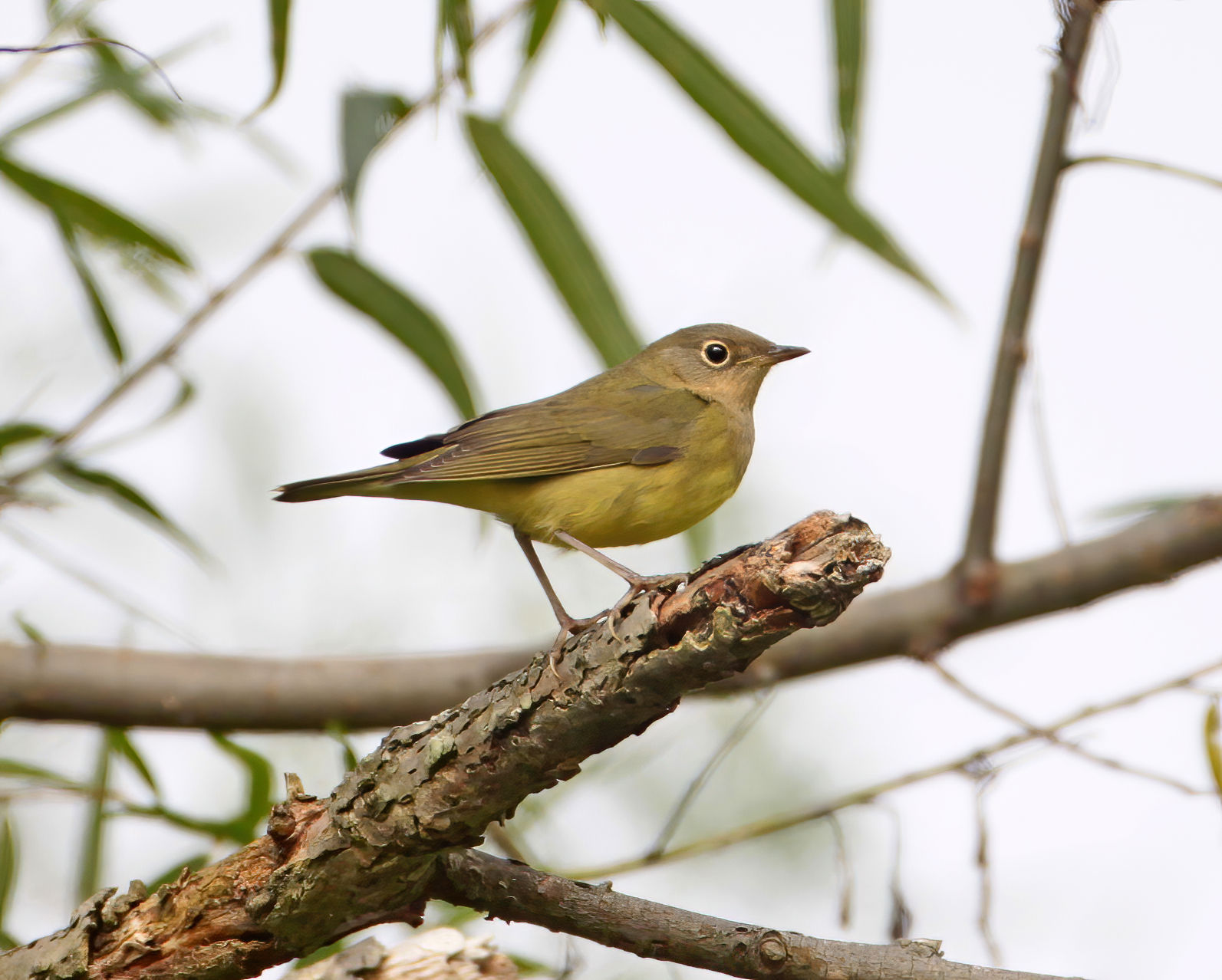

Conservation status
- Least Concern (IUCN 3.1)

Scientific classification
- Kingdom: Animalia
- Phylum: Chordata
- Class: Aves
- Order: Passeriformes
- Family: Parulidae
- Genus: Oporornis; Baird, 1858
- Species: O. agilis

Binomial name
- Oporornis agilis (Wilson, 1812)
- Range of O. agilis Breeding range Winter range

= Connecticut warbler =

Species of bird

The Connecticut warbler (Oporornis agilis) is a small songbird of the New World warbler family.

== Description ==
These medium-sized warblers measure 13–15 cm (5.1–5.9 in) in length, with a 22–23 cm (8.7–9.1 in) wingspan. Connecticut warblers weigh 10 g (0.35 oz) when they fledge, attaining an average weight of around 15 g (0.53 oz) as adults. However, birds preparing for migration pack on more weight to survive the strenuous journey and can weigh up to 25 g (0.88 oz). This species has light yellow underparts and olive upperparts; they have a light eye-ring, pink legs, a long tail, and a thin pointed bill. Males have a grey hood; females and immatures are more brown and have a whitish throat.

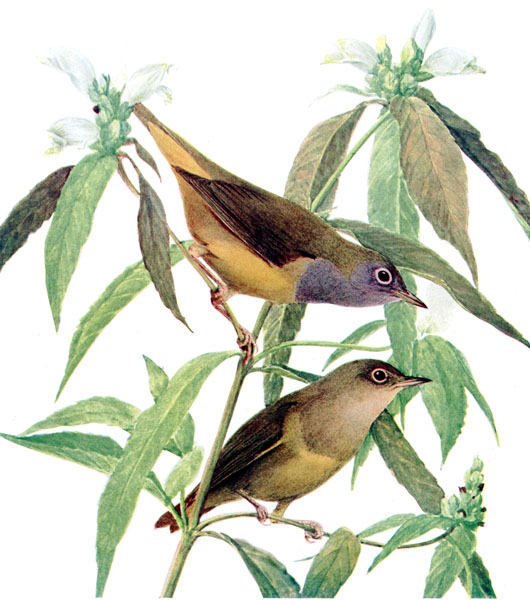
Male (atop) and female Connecticut warbler. Note how dull the female is in contrast to the male.

They forage on the ground, picking among dead leaves, or hop along branches. Like most warblers, these birds mainly eat insects and similar small invertebrates. They will also supplement their diet occasionally with seeds and berries. They are "skulking" birds that usually spend their time foraging within dense, low vegetation. Such behavior often renders them difficult to see well.

Despite its name, this bird only rarely visits Connecticut during migration. It was named by Alexander Wilson who observed the first classified specimen. They are fairly elusive birds, but it appears that their numbers may be declining due to loss of winter habitat.

== Taxonomy ==
The Connecticut warbler is now the only member of the genus Oporornis. The mourning, Kentucky, and MacGillivray's warblers were formerly included in Oporornis, but recent studies have found that these three warblers are more closely related to the yellowthroats in the genus Geothlypis.

== Habitat ==
Their breeding habitat is bogs or open deciduous woods near water, especially with poplar, spruce, tamarack or aspen, in central Canada and states bordering the Great Lakes. These habitats tend to be in rather remote areas that are hard to access for fieldwork; therefore, there is little data available on this species of birds. The nest is an open cup well-concealed in moss or a clump of grass. It is made of "dry grasses, stalk of weeds, and horsehairs".

== Breeding ==
Courtship begins right after the migrants arrive on their breeding grounds. It correlates with the time when males start to sing as this is how they court females. Couples have one brood per season. Connecticut warblers like to nest in thick understory where their young are protected from predators. Most lay in mid-June, though some populations have been observed to lay in July. Their eggs have a creamy color and they are speckled and blotched with chestnut and bay. Only females incubate. Fledglings are observed in late July and at the latest at the end of August. Both parents feed their young caterpillars, larvae, moths, and berries.

== Vocalization ==
The song of this bird is a loud repeated cheepa-cheepa. It's "similar in pitch to the Kentucky warbler and the Ovenbird". The call is a nasal pitch, it sounds like a raspy "witch". Like many songbirds, its song is heard during the breeding season but rarely during the fall.

== Behavior ==
The Connecticut warbler walks on the ground to forage insects and other sources of food. Its tail bobs up and down, which is reminiscent of wren and sandpiper behaviour. When it comes to sociability, the Connecticut warbler is a solitary species; however, groups of about twenty-five will come together in the fall before migration. It also will join other species, such as Blackpoll warblers, to feed during the fall. Males are highly territorial during breeding season, they defend an area which ranges from 0.24–0.48 hectares.

When it comes to parental care, both the male and the female will feed the juvenile. They will defend their young by screeching at predators.

== Migration ==
As mentioned earlier, the Connecticut warbler is an elusive species. Little is known about it outside of the breeding season as to this date, less than 25,000 individuals have been banded. These birds migrate to the Amazon Basin in South America in winter. Specimens have been observed in Colombia (north & southeast), Venezuela (northeast & interior), Guyana (at the border), and Peru (South). Connecticut warblers undertake different migratory routes in spring and in fall, an atypical behavior. In spring, they normally pass through the Midwest and only rarely migrate to the East Coast, but in fall, larger numbers of migrating birds move through the East Coast. Recently, the use of small tracking devices has enabled scientists to gather more data on the warbler's migration routes. They have discovered some individuals fly over open water like the Blackpoll warbler. More specifically, they recorded a previously undocumented two-day flight over the Caribbean to the Antilles. This correlates with sightings of Connecticut warblers that have occurred in Bermuda, St. Thomas and St Martin. Haiti on the island of Hispaniola is also a popular stop, but records there are hard to find due to the terrain being rather remote and past humanitarian crises; it is also additionally threatened by the ongoing deforestation in both Haiti and the Dominican Republic. There, they make a minimum of 48-hour stop (it usually lasts 5–7 days) in the Caribbean. This long migration over open water calls for strong selective pressures. A comparative study between the Connecticut warbler and the blackpoll warbler could help determine what selective pressures are present in these two species. This kind of migration also demands large reserves of fuel and this is why fat Connecticut warblers can be found on the East Coast in early fall. It's also the reason why they make several stopovers on their way south.

== Current threats ==
One of the main causes of mortality during migration is the collision of individuals into man-made structures. Collisions often occur against transparent glass panes, through which individuals can see vegetation and light. Habitat destruction is another threat to Connecticut warbler populations. Aspen logging on their breeding range (i.e. BC) and the application of pesticides get rid of nesting locations. The infestation of budworms on jack-pine trees also puts nesting sites at risk. The presence of power lines is also a danger to the Connecticut warbler: studies show that the presence of power lines reduces population densities in areas where they are present. In Alberta breeding sites, noise disturbances from gas pipelines are detrimental to the species as well. Studies show that Connecticut warblers did well in forests that have been cleared of shrubs and understory as they prefer trees; however, their abundance decreased in areas where the forest was clear-cut. Connecticut warblers are on the IUCN red list as a species of Least Concern. Nevertheless, some of its populations in Saskatchewan, Michigan, Minnesota, and Wisconsin are at risk. Conservation efforts are difficult due to a lack of research, though a handful of researchers have written some management plans, focusing on the preservation of woody wetlands, which are the Connecticut warbler's favored habitat.
