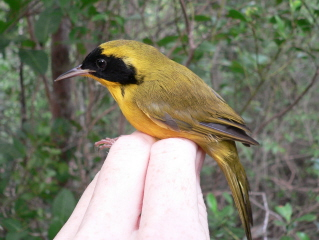

Conservation status
- Least Concern (IUCN 3.1)

Scientific classification
- Kingdom: Animalia
- Phylum: Chordata
- Class: Aves
- Order: Passeriformes
- Family: Parulidae
- Genus: Geothlypis
- Species: G. rostrata

Binomial name
- Geothlypis rostrata Bryant, H, 1867

= Bahama yellowthroat =

Species of bird

The Bahama yellowthroat (Geothlypis rostrata) is a species of bird in the family Parulidae, the New World warblers. It is endemic to the Bahamas.

== Taxonomy and systematics ==
The Bahama yellowthroat was formally described in 1867 with the binomial Geothlypis rostratus. Since then it has at various times been treated as a single species with what are now the common yellowthroat (G. trichas), Belding's yellowthroat (G. beldingi), and Altamira yellowthroat (G. flavoelata). It and the common and Belding's yellowthroats form a superspecies which possibly includes the Altamira as well.

The Bahama yellowthroat's further taxonomy is unsettled. The IOC, AviList, and BirdLife International's Handbook of the Birds of the World assign it these four subspecies:

- G. r. exigua Ridgway, 1902
- G. r. tanneri Ridgway, 1886
- G. r. rostrata Bryant, H, 1867
- G. r. coryi Ridgway, 1886

However, as of late 2025 the Clements taxonomy does not recognize G. r. exigua but includes it within G. r. rostrata.

This article follows the four-subspecies model.

== Description ==
The Bahama yellowthroat is 15 cm (5.9 in) long and weighs 15.1 to 17.3 g (0.53 to 0.61 oz). The species is sexually dimorphic. Adult males of the nominate subspecies G. r. rostrata have a wide black mask from their forehead around the eye to the side of the neck. Its top to rear have a thin grayish white border. Their hindcrown and nape are medium gray with a yellowish olive tinge. Their upperparts, wings, and tail are yellowish olive-green. Their throat is yellow and the rest of their underparts mostly a paler yellow with an olive wash on the flanks. Adult females have a plainer face than males, with a brownish crown, a thin grayish white supercilium, and grayish ear coverts. Their upper- and underparts are like the male's. Both sexes of all subspecies have a dark iris, a rather heavy black bill, and dusky pinkish legs and feet.

The other subspecies of the Bahama yellowthroat differ from the nominate and each other thus:

- G. r. exigua: slightly smaller with a slightly smaller bill; darker upperparts; border around male's mask is thinner and usually broken on the forecrown; rest of crown is darker gray
- G. r. coryi: brightest overall; mostly olive crown; mask border is yellow; flanks only lightly washed olive
- G. r. tanneri: head pattern and flank wash intermediate between nominate and coryi

== Similar species ==
The Bahama yellowthroat resembles the common yellowthroat, which is a common overwintering bird in the Bahamas. The Bahama yellowthroat is larger, with a heavier bill and more uniform yellow underparts. It also tends to move more slowly and deliberately than the common yellowthroat. The two also separate by habitat, with the Bahama yellowthroat preferring drier uplands and the common yellowthroat wetter, even marshy, landscapes.

== Distribution and habitat ==
The subspecies of the Bahama yellowthroat are found thus:

- G. r. exigua: Andros Island in the west-central Bahamas
- G. r. tanneri: Grand Bahama Island and Little Abaco and Great Abaco Islands in the northern Bahamas
- G. r. rostrata: New Providence Island in the west-central Bahamas
- G. r. coryi: Eleuthera Island and Cat Island in the east-central Bahamas

The Bahama yellowthroat primarily inhabits the understory of open pine forest, where it favors areas thick with bracken (Pteridium) and thatch palm (Thrinax radiata). It also occurs in smaller numbers in deciduous woodlands. It shuns marshes and other wet landscapes.

== Behavior ==
=== Movement ===
The Bahama yellowthroat is a sedentary year-round resident. Sight reports from Florida were not confirmed by physical evidence.

=== Feeding ===
The Bahama yellowthroat feeds mostly on insects and berries; it also occasionally feeds on small lizards (Anole). It gleans its food from vegetation.

=== Breeding ===
The Bahama yellowthroat breeds between May and July. Its nest is a cup that is usually built in dense low vegetation, though it is sometimes in a stump or high in a pine tree. The clutch is two eggs. Nothing else is known about the species' breeding biology.

=== Vocalization ===
The Bahama yellowthroat's song is "a loud wichety wichety wichit". It is similar to that of the common yellowthroat but slower and richer. It also makes a "quiet 'whisper-song', [that includes] short trills and spluttering notes". Its most common call is a "rather sharp tuck" that is less harsh than the common yellowthroat's. It also gives a dry rattle.

== Status ==
The IUCN has assessed the Bahama yellowthroat as being of Least Concern. Its population size is not known and is believed to be decreasing. As of 1998 it was "reported to be common on Grand Bahama, Abaco, Eleuthera and Cat Island, uncommon on Andros and rare on New Providence". Climate change is expected to affect its habitat. As of 2020 G. r. coryi has declined on Eleuthera and G. r. rostrata is "apparently seriously threatened" on New Providence. Since its arrival in the Bahamas in 1994 the brood parasite shiny cowbird (Moluthrus bonariensis) has become a threat.
