= Salt marsh common yellowthroat =

Conservation status
- Least Concern (IUCN 3.1)

Scientific classification
- Kingdom: Animalia
- Phylum: Chordata
- Class: Aves
- Order: Passeriformes
- Family: Parulidae
- Genus: Geothlypis
- Species: G. trichas
- Subspecies: G. t. sinuosa

Trinomial name
- Geothlypis trichas sinuosa (Linnaeus, 1766)

Subspecies of bird

The salt marsh common yellowthroat, Geothlypis trichas sinuosa, is a subspecies of the common yellowthroat, a New World warbler. It was first described by Joseph Grinnell in 1901, who distinguished it from neighboring western subspecies by darker dorsal coloration and slightly smaller size. Because of its discovery in San Francisco Bay, the subspecies is often referred to as the San Francisco common yellowthroat.

== Distribution and habitat ==
This subspecies occurs around San Francisco Bay, from Tomales Bay and San Pablo/Carquinez Strait south through the South Bay, occupying dense emergent marsh and riparian vegetation near water. Within San Francisco, most breeding records are concentrated at the Lake Merced complex.

== Threat ==
The salt marsh common yellowthroat has experienced a dramatic 80% decline from the early 20th century through 1976 due to significant loss of its preferred habitat, marshes and other areas of dense vegetation near water. Additional pressures include degradation of riparian thickets in urban settings and brood parasitism by the brown-headed cowbird.

== Conservation ==
Recognized by the California Department of Fish and Wildlife as a Bird Species of Special Concern, the subspecies is considered in local planning and restoration projects. For example, it is a species of concern for protection in efforts to restore Chelsea Wetlands in Hercules, California.
