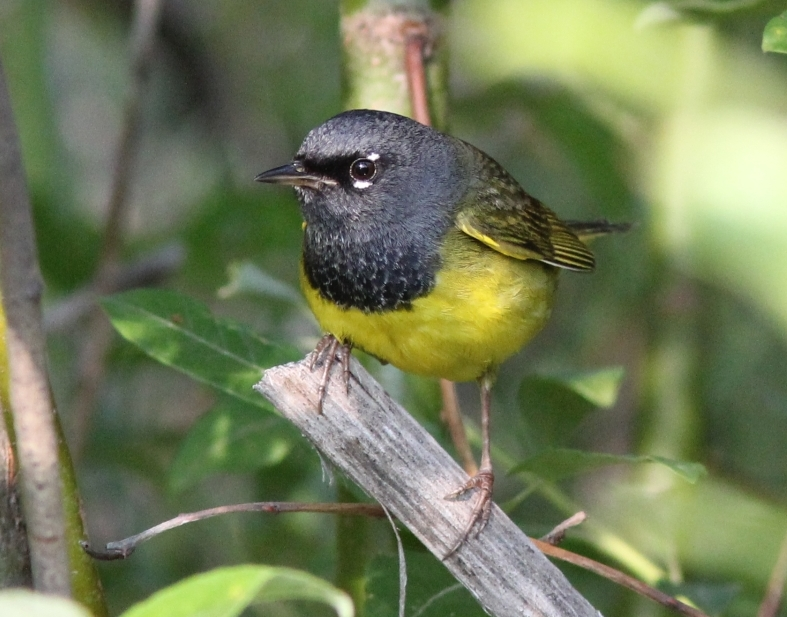
- Male
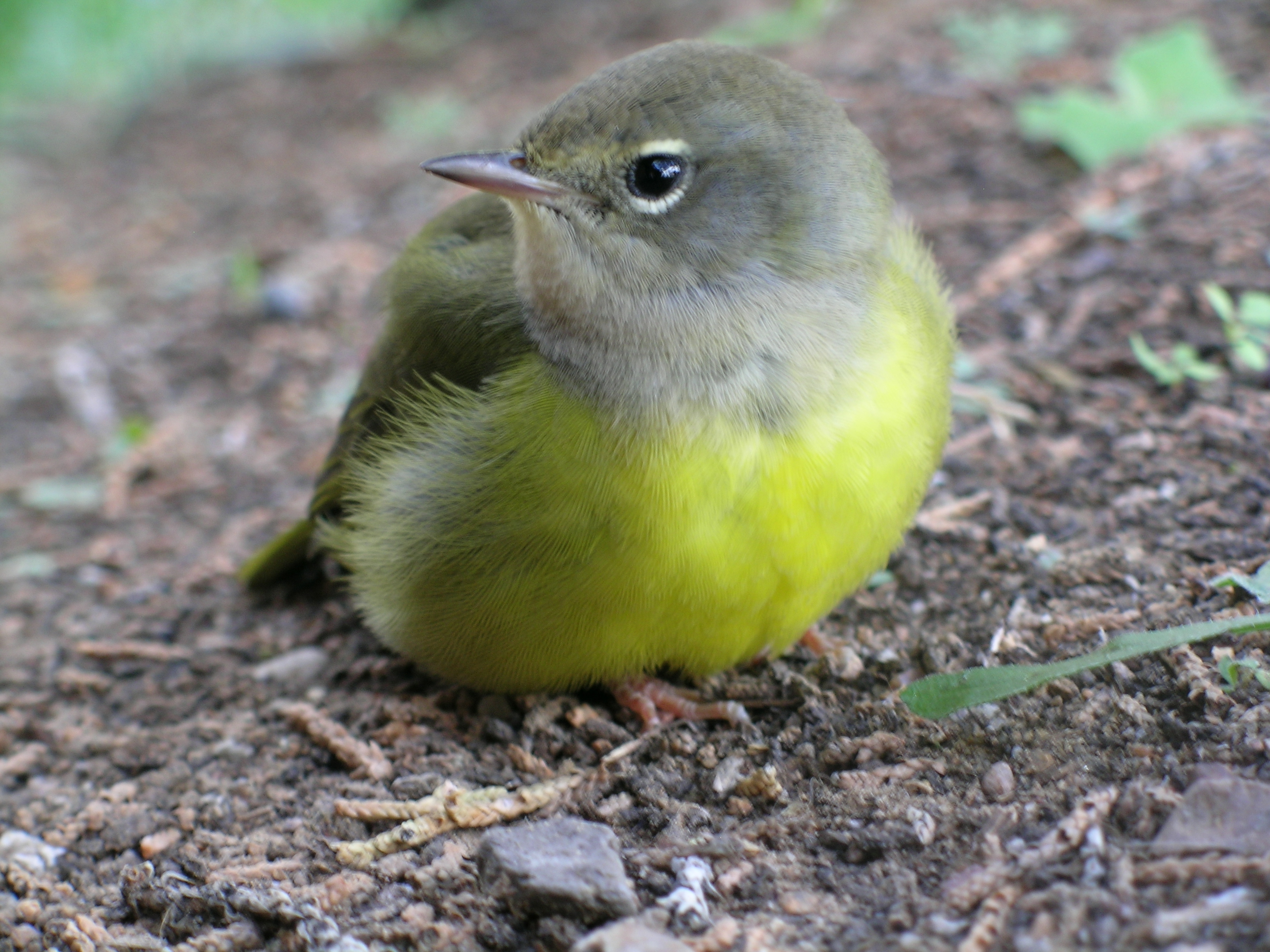
- Female

Conservation status
- Least Concern (IUCN 3.1)

Scientific classification
- Kingdom: Animalia
- Phylum: Chordata
- Class: Aves
- Order: Passeriformes
- Family: Parulidae
- Genus: Geothlypis
- Species: G. tolmiei

Binomial name
- Geothlypis tolmiei (Townsend, 1839)
- Breeding Overwintering

Synonyms
- See text

= MacGillivray's warbler =

Species of bird

MacGillivray's warbler (Geothlypis tolmiei) is a species of bird in the family Parulidae, the New World warblers. It is found from southeastern Alaska and western Canada to Panama.

== Taxonomy and systematics ==
MacGillivray's warbler was formally described by John Townsend in 1839 with the binomial Sylvia Tolmiei [sic] and the English name "Tolmie's Warbler". He drew on paintings in Audubon's Birds of America, in which Audubon had confused it with what was later named the mourning warbler (Geothlypis philadelphia). Townsend's names honor his friend William Fraser Tolmie. MaGillivray's and the mourning warblers are sister species and hybridize extensively. Audubon gave the species its current English name to honor William MacGillivray.

MacGillivray's warbler was long assigned to the genus Oporornis. The American Ornithological Society moved it to its present genus Geothlypis in 2011. The IOC made the change in 2012, BirdLife International's Handbook of the Birds of the World (HBW) in 2016, and the Clements taxonomy by 2018.

However, the further taxonomy of MacGillivray's warbler is unsettled. The IOC, HBW, and AviList assign it two subspecies, the nominate G. t. tolmiei (Townsend, 1839) and G. t. monticola (Phillips, AR, 1947). As of late 2025 Clements does not recognize G. t. monticola, but treats the species as monotypic.

This article follows the majority two-subspecies model.

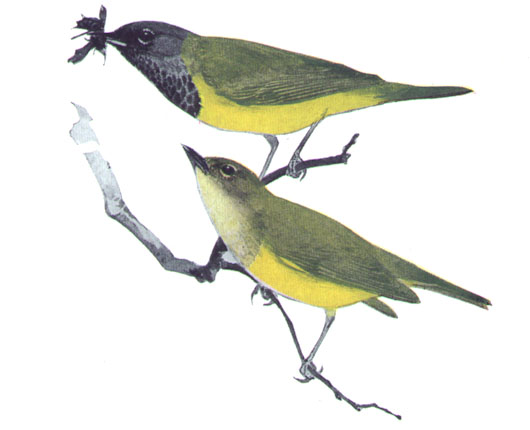
A MacGillivray's warbler pair by Bruce Horsfall

== Description ==
MacGillivray's warbler is 10 to 15 cm (3.9 to 5.9 in) long, weighs 9 to 13 g (0.32 to 0.46 oz), and has a wingspan of 19 cm (7.5 in). Adult males of the nominate subspecies have a mostly medium gray head and nape that often has a brownish or olive wash. They have darker gray to blackish lores and line through the eye and wide white crescents above and below the eye. Their back, rump, and uppertail coverts are yellowish olive-green. Their wings and tail are blackish brown with olive-green feather edges. Their throat and upper breast are medium gray, often with a brownish wash. Their lower breast is medium gray with black mottling. The rest of their underparts are yellow with a wash of yellowish olive-green on the flanks. Adult females resemble males but have a paler head. Their crown is more glaucous with some grayish olive and a brownish wash. Their lores and eyeline are not as dark as the male's and the eye crescents are less bold. Their throat and breast are paler gray with a buff wash and have no blackish mottling. Subspecies G. t. monticola has grayer upperparts and paler more greenish yellow underparts than the nominate. Both sexes of both subspecies have a black iris, a dusky brown maxilla, a pale pinkish buff mandible, and brown to burnt umber legs and feet.

== Distribution and habitat ==
The nominate subspecies of MacGillivray's warbler breeds west of the Cascade Range and Sierra Nevada from southeastern Alaska and southern Yukon south to about the latitude of Los Angeles. It winters mostly from southwestern Mexico including southern Baja California south through western Central America to western Panama. Subspecies G. t. monticola mostly breeds east of the Cascades and Sierras from eastern British Columbia south in the Rocky Mountains to southern Utah and Colorado. It also breeds in scattered areas south to Coahuila and Nuevo León in northeastern Mexico. It winters mostly in central to southern Mexico to the east of the nominate's winter range. vagrants have been discovered as far east as Massachusetts.

In its breeding range MacGillivray's warbler inhabits a variety of forest types that are characterized by dense undergrowth and a moderately open canopy. It often inhabits regenerating clearcuts and burned areas. Especially in the southern parts of its breeding range it is often in riparian zones. In migration it often occurs in non-forested shrublands as well as forests, and in Mexico and Central America in shade coffee plantations. It generally shuns open desert. In its winter range, at lower elevations it occurs in mangroves, the edges of evergreen forest, and thorn scrub. At higher elevations it mostly occurs in the undergrowth of forest.

== Behavior ==
=== Movement ===
The breeding and wintering ranges of MacGillivray's warbler are described above. In migration between them it moves in a fairly broad front. Subspecies G. t. monticola includes the western Great Plains as well as the more direct route between its breeding and wintering ranges. Fall migration spans from late July to late November and spring from mid-March to mid June.

=== Feeding ===
MacGillivray's warbler feeds on a wide variety of larval and adult insects. It takes most by gleaning from leaves on the ground and low to the ground from leaves, branches, and bark.

=== Breeding ===
Overall, MacGillivray's warbler breeds between the end of April and mid-August with the last eggs noted in early July. Females do most of the nest building. The nest is an open cup made from grass, bark, leaves, and other coarse plant material lined with softer grass, rootlets, and hair. Nests are concealed in grass or shrubs at an average of about 0.5 m (1.6 ft) above the ground. The maximum clutch size is five eggs; eggs are creamy white with darker spots and speckles. The female alone incubates, for about 11 to 13 days. Fledging occurs about eight to nine days after hatch. Both parents provision nestlings but females do more than males. The brown-headed cowbird (Molthrus ater) is a brood parasite, with the incidence greater in nests closer to human habitation than further away.

=== Vocalization ===
The primary song of male MacGillivray's warbler is "6-8 syllables described as churry churry churry churry cheery cheery". Both sexes make calls, "a harsh chip note" and "a high-frequency chip". Males sing mostly at dawn and dusk, typically from a high perch.

== Status ==
The IUCN has assessed MacGillivray's warbler as being of Least Concern. It has an extremely large range; its estimated population of at least 11 million mature individuals is believed to be decreasing. The only identified threat is ecosystem change resulting from climate change, and its severity is not known.
