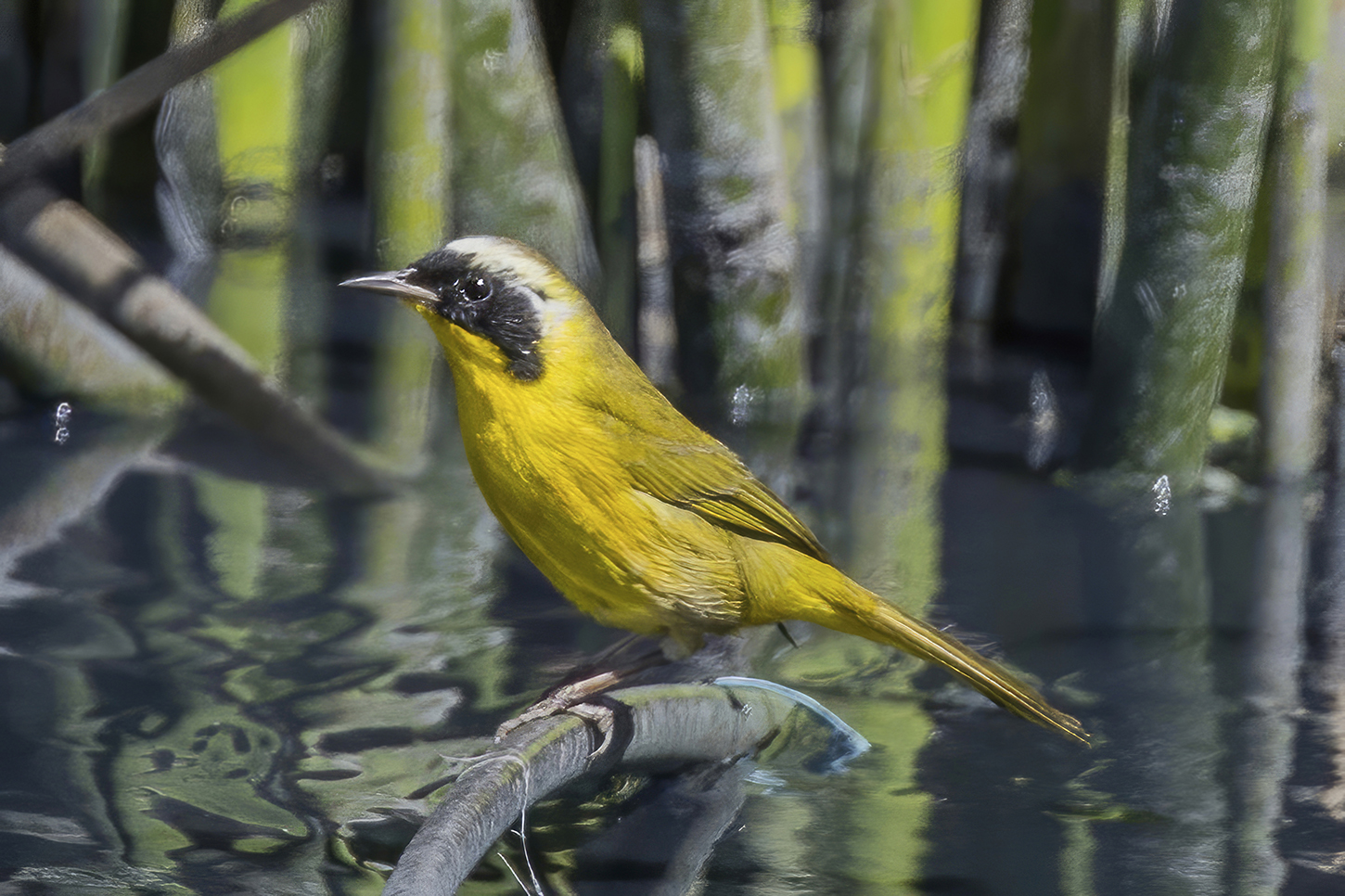
- Lerma de Villada, Mexico

Conservation status
- Least Concern (IUCN 3.1)

Scientific classification
- Kingdom: Animalia
- Phylum: Chordata
- Class: Aves
- Order: Passeriformes
- Family: Parulidae
- Genus: Geothlypis
- Species: G. nelsoni

Binomial name
- Geothlypis nelsoni Richmond, 1900

= Hooded yellowthroat =

Species of bird

The hooded yellowthroat (Geothlypis nelsoni) is a species of bird in the family Parulidae, the New World warblers. It is endemic to Mexico.

== Taxonomy and systematics ==
The hooded yellowthroat was formally described by Charles Richmond in 1900 with its current binomial Geothlypis nelsoni. It had originally been named Geothlypis cucullata but Richmond determined that that name already applied to another species, so by the principle of priority a new binomial was needed. Its specific epithet honors Edward William Nelson, "who has so thoroughly explored Mexico in the past few years".

The hooded yellowthroat has two subspecies, the nominate G. n. nelsoni (Richmond, 1900) and G. n. karlenae (Moore, RT, 1946). Robert Moore named karlenae after his daughter.

== Description ==
The hooded yellowthroat is about 13 cm (5.1 in) long and weighs about 10 to 12 g (0.35 to 0.42 oz). The species is sexually dimorphic. Adult males of the nominate subspecies have a wide black mask from the forehead past the eye to the side of the neck. It is bordered top and back with a medium gray band. The rest of their head and their upperparts, wings, and tail are dull olive-green. Their throat and underparts are yellow with a slightly paler belly and an olive wash on the flanks. Females have no black on their face. They have a pale grayish stripe above the lores and an olive crown and ear coverts. Their upper- and underparts are like the male's. Males of subspecies G. n. karlenae have a slightly wider mask than the nominate. Females have a more orangey breast and more bronze-yellow undertail coverts. Both sexes of both subspecies have a dark iris, a black bill that in the non-breeding season has a pale mandible, and dusky pinkish legs and feet.

== Distribution and habitat ==
The nominate subspecies of the hooded yellowthroat is the more northerly of the two. It is found in the Sierra Madre Oriental from southeastern Coahuila south to west-central Veracruz and northern Puebla. Subspecies G. n. karlenae is found in the central highlands from the Distrito Federal and southern Puebla south to north-central Oaxaca. The species primarily inhabits dry scrublands, brushlands, and chaparral in the subtropical and temperate zones, though it also occurs in damper parts of them. It favors a biome called pedregal that is characterized by cactus scrub on lava beds. In winter it also inhabits the edges of pine-oak woodlands. Sources differ on the species' elevational range. One states it is 2,000 to 3,100 m (6,600 to 10,200 ft). More recent ones list it as 1,250 to 3,000 m (4,100 to 9,800 ft) and 1,400 to 3,100 m (4,600 to 10,200 ft).

== Behavior ==
=== Movement ===
The hooded yellowthroat is considered a year-round resident. However, it may make some short-distance seasonal movements between pedregal and woodland edges.

=== Feeding ===
The hooded yellowthroat feeds on insects and other invertebrates. It usually forages by gleaning in dense low vegetation.

=== Breeding ===
The hooded yellowthroat's breeding season has not been defined but is thought to be April to July. Its nest is a cup made from coarse grass lined with finer grass and is typically placed near the ground in a dense clump of grass. Nothing else is known about the species' breeding biology.

=== Vocalization ===
The hooded yellowthroat's song is "a series of witchy notes ending with upward-inflected notes". It has been written as "tsjúchohtsjúchot". Its calls are "a dry tchip or tchrrek, [a] softer tchk,...and a dry rattle like that of [a] Troglodytes wren when agitated".

== Status ==
The IUCN has assessed the hooded yellowthroat as being of Least Concern. It has a large range; its estimated population of at least 20,000 mature individuals is believed to be decreasing. No immediate threats have been identified. It is considered "frequent to uncommon" throughout its range.
