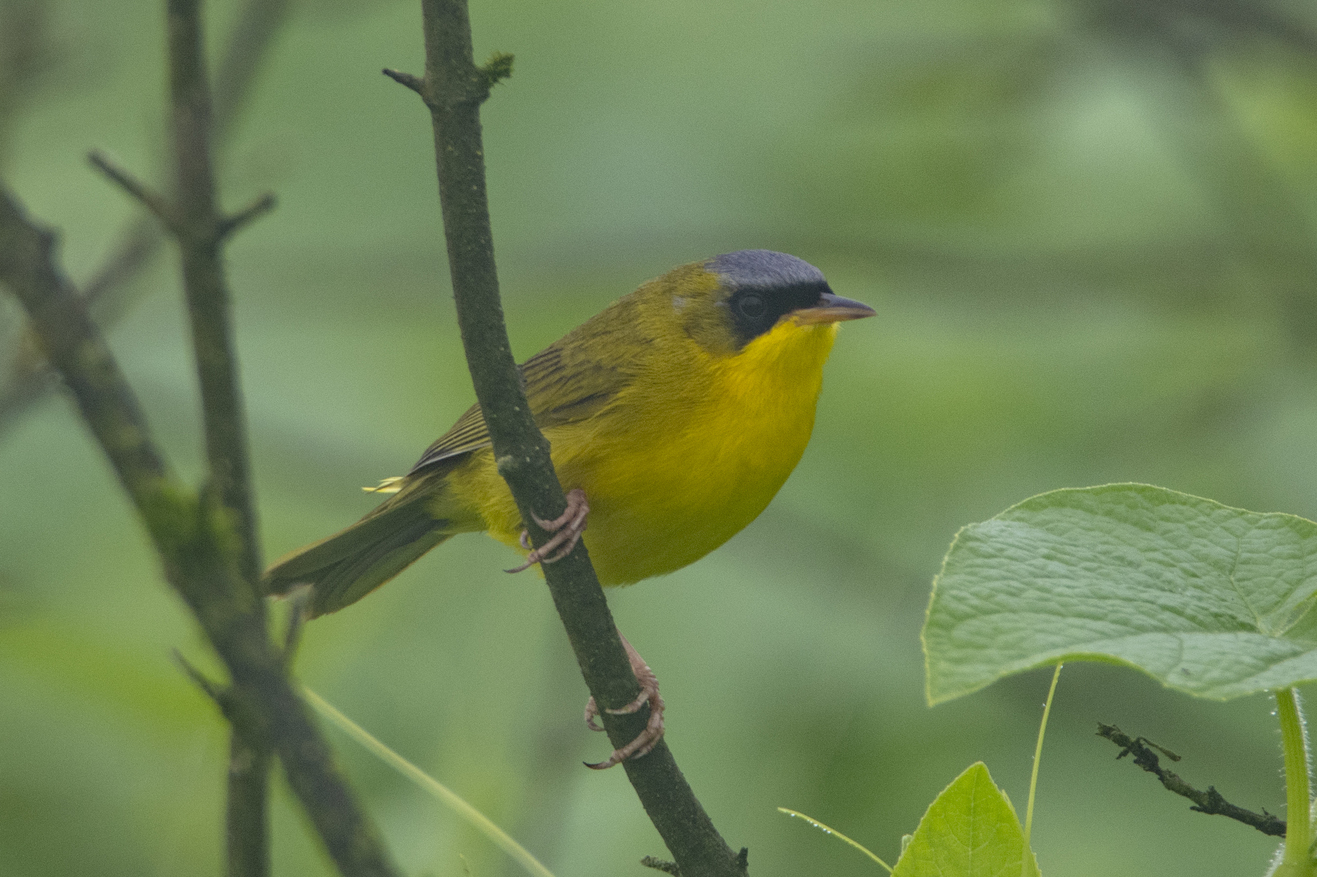
- In Peru

Conservation status
- Least Concern (IUCN 3.1)

Scientific classification
- Kingdom: Animalia
- Phylum: Chordata
- Class: Aves
- Order: Passeriformes
- Family: Parulidae
- Genus: Geothlypis
- Species: G. auricularis

Binomial name
- Geothlypis auricularis Salvin, 1883

Audio
- Song

= Black-lored yellowthroat =

Species of bird

The black-lored yellowthroat (Geothlypis auricularis) is a species of bird in the family Parulidae, the New World warblers. It is found in Ecuador and Peru.

== Taxonomy and systematics ==
The black-lored yellowthroat was formally described in 1883 with its current binomial Geothlypis auricularis.

The black-lored yellowthroat's further taxonomy is not fully resolved. Well into the twenty-first century it was treated as a subspecies of the masked yellowthroat (Geothlypis aequinoctialis). In 2015 the IOC recognized it again as a full species. BirdLife International's Handbook of the Birds of the World (HBW) recognized it in 2017 and the Clements taxonomy in 2022. The initial version of AviList in 2025 also treats it as a species. However, the South American Classification Committee retains it as a subspecies of the masked yellowthroat.

The black-lored yellowthroat has two subspecies, the nominate G. a. auricularis (Salvin, 1883) and G. a. peruviana (Taczanowski, 1884). Some authors have suggested that they should both be treated as full species.

== Description ==
The black-lored yellowthroat is 12.5 to 14 cm (4.9 to 5.5 in) long and weighs about 8 to 11 g (0.28 to 0.39 oz). The species is sexually dimorphic. Adult males have a triangle-shaped velvety black mask from their forehead and forecrown to just past the eye. They have a pale slate-gray crown. Their nape, upperparts, and tail are yellowish green to olive green. The upper surface of their flight feathers is yellowish green to olive green with dark brown inner webs; the lower surface is brown. Their throat and underparts are unmarked bright yellow. Females have no black on their head. Their crown and ear coverts are gray-washed olive. They have a pale yellow stripe above the lores and an eye-ring of the same color. Their upper- and underparts are like the male's but paler overall. Subspecies G. a. peruviana is slightly larger than the nominate. Males have a slightly larger black mask and their crown is a slightly paler gray. It is otherwise like the nominate, as is the female. Both sexes of both subspecies have a dark brown iris, a blackish maxilla, a pinkish horn mandible, and yellow-pink to orange-yellow legs and feet.

== Distribution and habitat ==
The black-lored yellowthroat has a disjunct distribution. The nominate subspecies has the larger range of the two. It is found along the Pacific slope from northern Manabí Province in northwestern Ecuador south through Peru to Ica Department. Subspecies G. a. peruviana is found in the middle and upper Marañón River valley from extreme southern Zamora-Chinchipe Province in Ecuador into Peru to Huánuco Department.

The black-lored yellowthroat is generally a bird of arid to moderately dry landscapes. It is found primarily in arid scrublands both near the coast and at higher elevations and in drier deciduous forest. However, it also inhabits moister evergreen forest. In Ecuador the nominate subspecies ranges in elevation from sea level mostly to 1,100 m (3,600 ft) and has been found as high as 2,200 m (7,200 ft). In Peru it reaches at least 1,800 m (5,900 ft). Subspecies G. a. peruviana is found between 850 and 1,650 m (2,800 and 5,400 ft) in Ecuador and up to 2,700 m (8,900 ft) in Peru.

== Behavior ==
=== Movement ===
The black-lored yellowthroat is believed to be mostly a year-round resident though some short-distance seasonal movements are suspected.

=== Feeding ===
The black-lored yellowthroat's diet has not been studied but is believed to be almost entirely small invertebrates. It forages singly or in pairs, almost always in dense low vegetation. It occasionally joins mixed-species feeding flocks.

=== Breeding ===
The first black-lored yellowthroat's nest was discovered in March 2005, and apparently none have been documented since. It held three very young unfeathered nestlings. The nest was a messy open cup made from dried grass and Chusquea bamboo leaves lined with rootlets and fungal rhizomorphs. It was well hidden 12 cm (5 in) above the ground in a Verbena shrub. The shrub and most of the surrounding dense spiny vegetation were about 1 m (3 ft) tall. The female was seen brooding the nestlings. The incubation period, time to fledging, and other details of parental care could not be determined.

=== Vocalization ===
The two subspecies of the black-lored yellowthroat have somewhat different songs and calls. The nominate's is "a short vigous series of clear notes ending in a warble, swee-swee-swee-swee-chuchuchuchu". That of subspecies G. a. peruviana is "a pleasant warble becoming a faster descending series of shorter notes, weche-chewi-chechi-we-tititittitit". Another description and rendering of G. a. peruviana's song is "a variable rich, lilting warbled series that accelerates and descends in pitch, for example: dre chree-chee-chee'chi'chur'di". The nominate's call is a "burry or wheezy overslurred note rreew" and that of G. a. peruviana is a "distinctly disyllabic wheezy je-jeeuw". Males alone sing and both sexes call.

== Status ==
The IUCN has assessed the black-lored yellowthroat as being of Least Concern. It has a large range; its population size is not known but is believed to be stable. No immediate threats have been identified. It is considered fairly common in Ecuador, fairly common in northwestern Peru, and less common further south and in the Marañón Valley. The nominate occurs in several protected areas and G. a. peruviana in fewer. The species "appears to persist, if not thrive, in anthropogentically altered landscapes such as urban gardens and parks".
