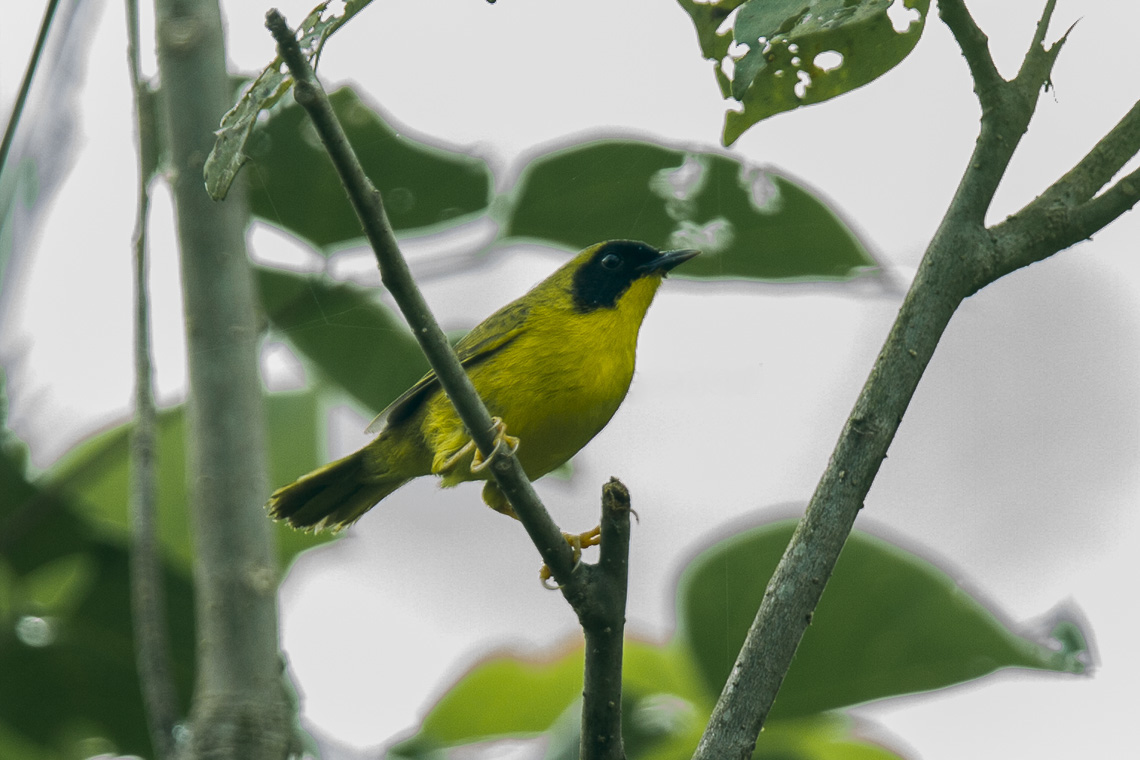

Conservation status
- Least Concern (IUCN 3.1)

Scientific classification
- Kingdom: Animalia
- Phylum: Chordata
- Class: Aves
- Order: Passeriformes
- Family: Parulidae
- Genus: Geothlypis
- Species: G. semiflava

Binomial name
- Geothlypis semiflava Sclater, PL, 1860

= Olive-crowned yellowthroat =

Species of bird

The olive-crowned yellowthroat (Geothlypis semiflava) is a species of bird in the family Parulidae, the New World warblers. It is found in Colombia, Costa Rica, Ecuador, Honduras, Nicaragua, and Panama.

== Taxonomy and systematics ==
The olive-crowned yellowthroat was formally described in 1860 by the English zoologist Philip Sclater based on a specimen that had been collected near Babahoyo in Ecuador by the zoologist Louis Fraser. Sclater coined the binomial name Geothlypis semiflava, where the specific epithet combines the Latin semi- meaning "half-" with flavus meaning "yellow".

Three subspecies are recognised:

- G. s. chiriquensis Salvin, 1872 – Pacific slope of far southern Costa Rica and western Panama (western Chiriquí)
- G. s. bairdi Ridgway, 1884 – tropical northeastern Honduras to Nicaragua, Costa Rica, and northwestern Panama
- G. s. semiflava Sclater, 1860 – Pacific lowlands of western Colombia to western Ecuador (El Oro)

The subspecies G. s. chiriquensis has sometimes been considered as a subspecies of the masked yellowthroat (Geothlypis aequinoctialis). It has also been treated as a separate species, the Chiriqui yellowthroat.

== Description ==
The olive-crowned yellowthroat is 11.1 to 13.5 cm (4.4 to 5.3 in) long and weighs 15.5 to 17.5 g (0.55 to 0.62 oz). The species is sexually dimorphic. Adult males of the nominate subspecies G. s. semiflava have a wide black mask from their forehead and forecrown around the eye to the side of the neck. The rest of their head and their upperparts, wings, and tail are olive-green. Their throat and underparts are yellow with an olive wash on the flanks. Adult females have no black on their face. They have a mostly olive-green head with a thin yellowish supercilium. Their upper- and underparts are like the male's.

Males of subspecies G. s. bairdi are similar to the nominate with the addition of a brown wash on the head and upperparts that is especially strong on the rump and tail. They have more extensive olive on their flanks that narrows the underparts' yellow and also dusky primaries with olive-green edges on the outer webs. Females also have more olive wash on their underparts. Males of G. s. chiriquensis have a gray crown and a gray line along the top and rear of the black mask. Their nape, upperparts, tail, and wings except their primaries are bright yellowish green. Their primaries are dusky with bright yellowish green outer webs. Their sides and flanks are greenish yellow and the rest of their underparts bright yellow. Females have a gray mask and cheeks and a very faint supercilium. Both sexes of all subspecies have a dark iris, a black bill with pale horn tomia and gonys, and pinkish horn or dull orange legs and feet.

== Distribution and habitat ==
Subspecies G. s. bairdi of the olive-crowned yellowthroat is the northernmost. It is found from far eastern Honduras south along the Caribbean slope through Nicaragua and Costa Rica into northwestern Panama as far as Bocas del Toro Province. Subspecies G. s. chiriquensis is found from extreme southwestern Costa Rica into western Panama's Chiriquí Province. G. s. semiflava is found from Chocó Department in west-central Colombia south in the Pacific coastal area to central Manabí Province and beyond there more inland to El Oro Province.

The olive-crowned yellowthroat inhabits a variety of landscapes including marshes, damp pastures with tall grass and shrubs, and thickets of bamboo. Most are near water, usually ponds but also moving watercourses. In elevation it is found from sea level to 1,500 m (4,900 ft) overall in Central America but to 1,200 m (3,900 ft) in Costa Rica. In Colombia it reaches 1,800 m (5,900 ft) and in Ecuador is mostly below 1,200 m (3,900 ft).

== Behavior ==
=== Movement ===
The olive-crowned yellowthroat is a sedentary year-round resident.

=== Feeding ===
The olive-crowned yellowthroat's diet has not been studied but is assumed to be mostly insects and other invertebrates. It typically forages singly or in pairs and captures prey by gleaning from low dense vegetation.

=== Breeding ===
The olive-crowned yellowthroat's breeding seasons have not been defined. However, it is known to span at least April to June in Costa Rica. In Colombia it appears to breed at least between January and April. The species' nest is an open cup made from coarse grasses lined with finer plant fibers and hair. They are typically placed in a clump of grass less than 1 m (3 ft) above the ground. The clutch is one or two eggs that are white with markings of several darker colors. The incubation period for G. s. chiriquensis is 15 days. Nothing else is known about the species' breeding biology.

=== Vocalization ===
In Costa Rica the olive-crowned yellowthroat sings "sweet, wren-like phrases". One rendering of it is "wichay-chu wichaychu wichaychu witchetchay-chu witchety chay-chu witchety chay-chu witchety-chrrr". The nominate subspecies sings "a rich and musical series of phrases that usually ends in a jumble". It has been written as "sew-sew-swe’swe’sweseewuu-seewuu...". The species' calls include "a hoarse chuck, a nasal chee-uw or chreeuw, a sharp chip or kip, and a short, dry, downslurred chatter in alarm or agitation".

== Status ==
The IUCN follows HBW taxonomy and so has separately assessed each of the olive-crowned yellowthroat's subspecies. All are assessed to be of Least Concern. None of their population sizes are known. The population of "Baird's" yellowthroat is believed to be stable. Those of the "olive-crowned" (sensu stricto) and "Chiriqui" yellowthroats are believed to be increasing. No immediate threats to any have been identified. The species is considered overall "frequent to uncommon" in Central America. In Costa Rica it is common in the lowlands but uncommon above them. It is considered common in Colombia and Ecuador.
