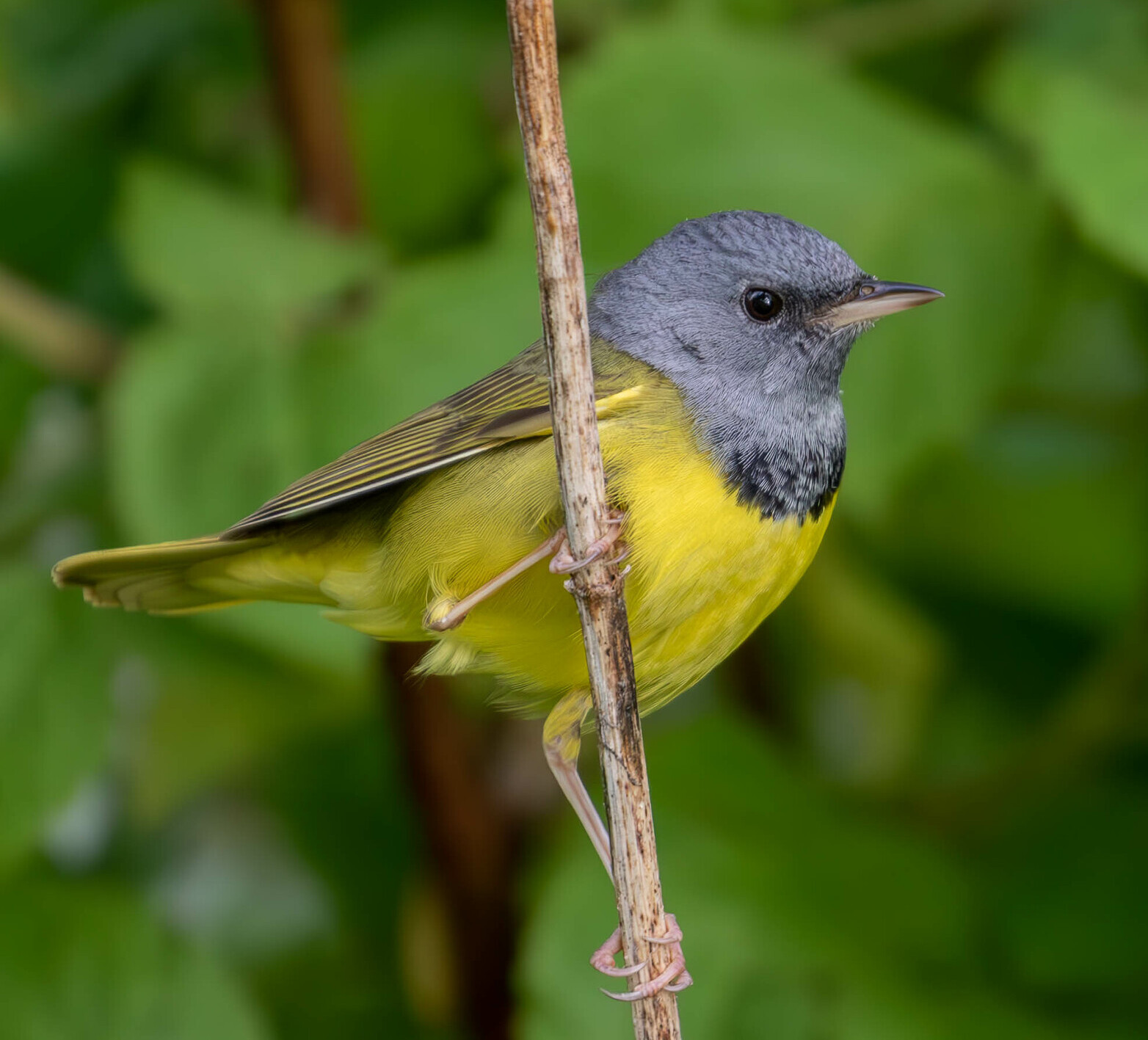

Conservation status
- Least Concern (IUCN 3.1)

Scientific classification
- Kingdom: Animalia
- Phylum: Chordata
- Class: Aves
- Order: Passeriformes
- Family: Parulidae
- Genus: Geothlypis
- Species: G. philadelphia

Binomial name
- Geothlypis philadelphia (Wilson, 1810)
- Range of G. philadelphia Breeding range Wintering range

Synonyms
- Oporornis philadelphia

= Mourning warbler =

Species of bird

The mourning warbler (Geothlypis philadelphia) is a small songbird of the New World warbler family. Mourning warblers are neotropical migrants native to eastern and central North America and wintering in Central and South America. They tend to be found in dense second growth forests. They are very similar to the MacGillivray's warbler in appearance, especially in females and immature birds, but their breeding range does not overlap into the west.

The "mourning" in this bird's name refers to the male's hood, thought to resemble a mourning veil.

== Identification ==
Mourning warblers are small songbird with yellow underparts, olive-green upperparts, a thin pointed bill and pink legs. Adult males have a gray hood, black lores and a black patch on the throat and breast. In the fall, this pattern becomes less bright and harder to distinguish from similar species; however they never have a broken eye ring. Females and immatures are gray-brown on the head with an incomplete eye-ring. They have a yellow-gray throat with a brown or olive tint to their breast. Both sexes can range from 10 to 15 cm (3.9–5.9 in) in length and 11–13 g (0.4–0.5 oz) in weight. Their wingspan is 18 cm (7.1 in). Other than the MacGillivray's Warbler, similar species include the Connecticut warblers which have a complete eye ring, not to be confused with a broken eye ring seen on immature mourning warblers. Immature Connecticut warblers also have a whiter chest compared to the yellow chest on immature mourning warblers. Nashville warblers are also commonly confused; however they have a yellow throat unlike the black or grey throats of mourning warblers, females have a grey back, and they are smaller and less active than mourning warblers.

== Distribution and habitat ==
During the breeding season, mourning warblers prefer second growth clearings. This habitat is made up of thickets, semi-open areas with dense shrubs, dead fallen trees and covered canopies. Second growth clearings are caused by human activities such as mining, logging, and agriculture. They can also be caused by natural occurrences such as storms, natural fires or insect outbreaks. In the Appalachians and northernmost parts of their range, they are known to seek out habitat at higher elevations. The clearings are usually occupied after 1–2 years of regeneration, though some Mourning warblers have been captured in areas 3–6 years after logging. After 7 years or so, the habitat becomes too overgrown for breeding mourning warblers.

While they often occupy similar habitat to their breeding habitat in the winter, they have also been known to occupy scrublands, dry woods, coasts and urban areas outside of their breeding season which contrasts with their breeding season preferences.

=== Range ===
While breeding, they can be found in Newfoundland and Labrador, Nova Scotia, southwest Northwest Territories and northeastern British Columbia. Their southernmost breeding grounds include North Dakota, Minnesota, Illinois, Wisconsin, Michigan, New York (state), Pennsylvania, West Virginia and Virginia.Breeding populations overlap with several other warbler species including the Kentucky warbler, Chestnut-sided warbler, and Connecticut warbler. Winter ranges vary between latin and southern American countries. They are common in Ecuador, Venezuela and Colombia, but have also been found in Nicaragua, Costa Rica, El Salvador, and the Dominican Republic. Local distribution changes frequently, given their preference for disturbed forests. Means of which forests become altered such as logging or agriculture move frequently, in turn mourning warbler populations follow.

== Behavior and ecology ==
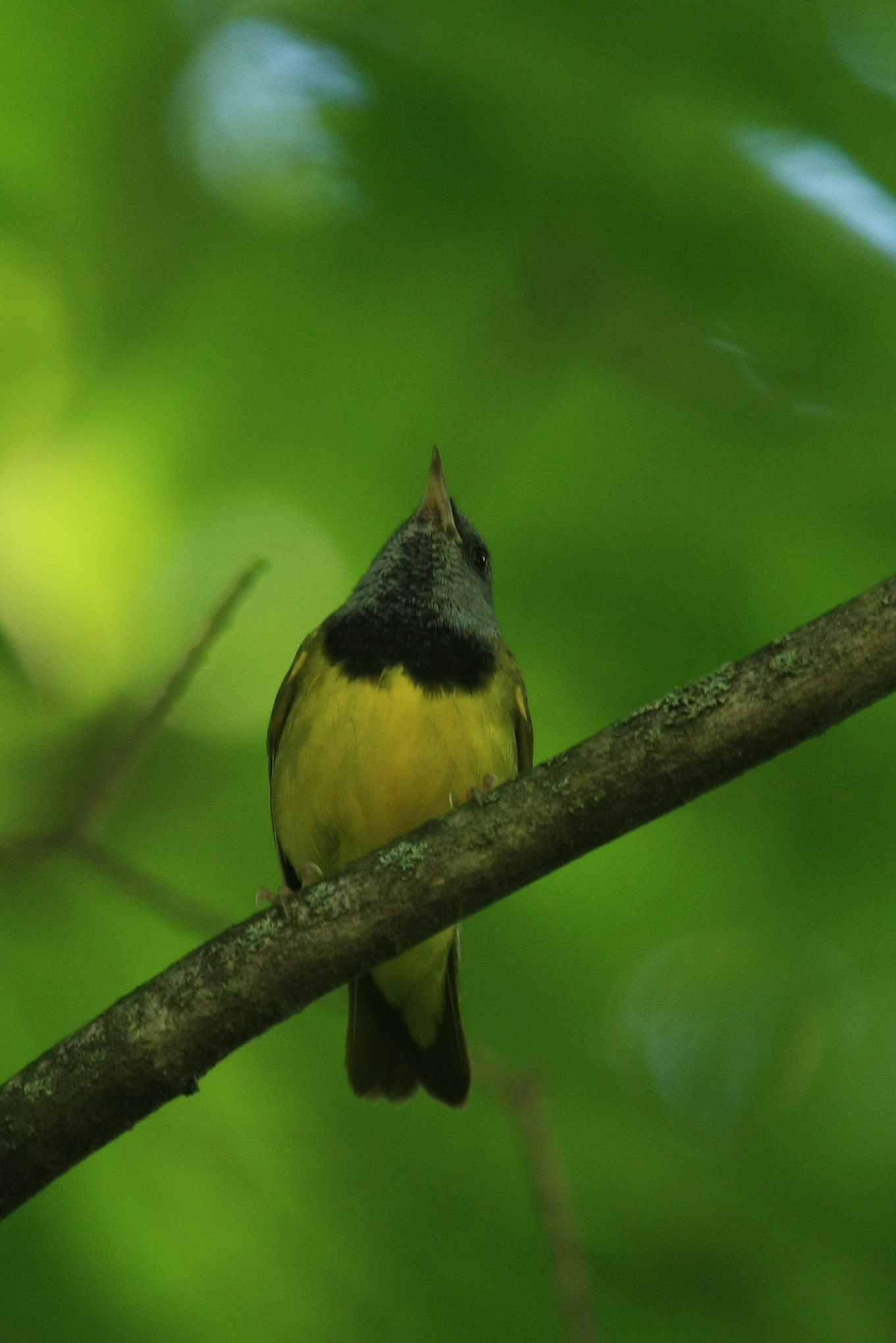

=== Diet ===
Mourning warblers forage for food low in vegetation, along tree branches, and catch insects in flight. Mourning warblers diet mainly consist of insects, spiders, beetles, caterpillars and larvae, but also some plant material including fruiting bodies from the Cecropia tree during the winter. They eat more fruits during their migration. Mourning warblers are also known to remove the legs and wings of the insects before consuming.

=== Breeding ===
Mourning warblers' nests are open cupped and placed low to or on the ground in a well-concealed location under thick shrubs, other vegetation or canopies which they use as shelter. Their nest is usually made out of grass, leaves and bark and lined with roots or other thin material. Nests are around 6.3 inches across and 3.4 inches tall.

Mourning warblers typically lay 2–5 eggs, which are white or speckled brown and black in appearance. Incubation is 12 days long and both adult males and females are responsible. Mourning warblers have young with gray tufts on their head and red mouths. Adult females are also known consume their eggs after their young hatch. The number of days for young to fledge is 7–9.

=== Migration ===
Mourning warblers begin to migrate south for the winter from northern United States and Canada in late August but sometimes leave as late as November. They arrive in central America in September through October. They begin their migration back north in March, but sometimes in May. When returning north, mourning warblers generally follow the coast of central America. They follow the Mississippi River and Ohio River valleys before they disperse to the east and west. Mourning warblers that breed in the east follow the Appalachian Mountain ranges and east coast. They reach their breeding grounds by May and June, and repeat the process.

Climate change may be affecting breeding and migration. A study showed that during seasons with a higher median temperature, more females arrived to breeding grounds than males. The study also showed that the warming climate had not affected arrival of males on breeding grounds earlier than females, known as protandry.

=== Vocalization ===
A mourning warbler singing

The song of this bird is a bright repetitive warble. The warble consists of rolling phrases that sound that typically lower in volume at the end and can sound like "chirry, chirry, chirry, chorry, chorry." The call is a sharp chip. There are usually two different pitched calls, with one higher than the harsh chip. Male mourning warblers use calls to establish their territory and scare away other males.

Mourning warblers' calls vary between regions, known as regiolects. Regiolects are defined as differences in syllables. There are several regiolects found across the mourning warbler's range: A Newfoundland regiolect, a Nova Scotia regiolect, and an eastern and western regiolect. The eastern regiolect is found in Quebec and eastern United States. The western regiolect is found in Minnesota, western Ontario and Alberta. Some possible explanations are the island effect, geographical separations such as large bodies of water, and human development.

== Conservation ==
According to the North American Breeding Bird Survey, mourning warbler populations have declined by about 43% in the last 50 years. However, they are still categorized as a species of least concern with 14 million estimated as a global breeding population by Partners in Flight. Partners in flight generates conservation plans such as prescribed burnings and other active disturbances to create habitat for the mourning warbler. Hiking trails in Ontario have set a precedent in conservation for mourning warblers. Breeding mourning warblers are most common in parts of the forest without hiking trails. This led to the placement of trails with mourning warblers and other ground nesting birds in mind, as to not disturb them and other ground nesting species.

=== Interactions with humans ===
Numbers show that mourning warblers are frequently killed by buildings. Mourning warblers are 19.3 times more likely to crash into low-rise buildings than other bird species. Similar to other wildlife species, it is common for the mourning warbler to be killed by motor vehicles as well. Herbicides are also a danger to mourning warblers. While the effect is small, there are herbicides that disturb mourning warblers more than others.
