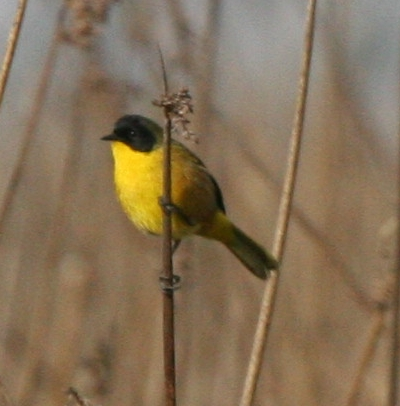

Conservation status
- Vulnerable (IUCN 3.1)

Scientific classification
- Kingdom: Animalia
- Phylum: Chordata
- Class: Aves
- Order: Passeriformes
- Family: Parulidae
- Genus: Geothlypis
- Species: G. speciosa

Binomial name
- Geothlypis speciosa PL Sclater, 1859

= Black-polled yellowthroat =

Species of bird

The black-polled yellowthroat (Geothlypis speciosa) is a Vulnerable species of bird in the family Parulidae, the New World warblers. It is endemic to Mexico.

== Taxonomy and systematics ==
The black-polled yellowthroat was formally described in 1859 with its current binomial Geothlypis speciosa. It has two subspecies, the nominate G. s. speciosa (PL Sclater, 1859) and G. s. limnatis (Dickerman, 1970).

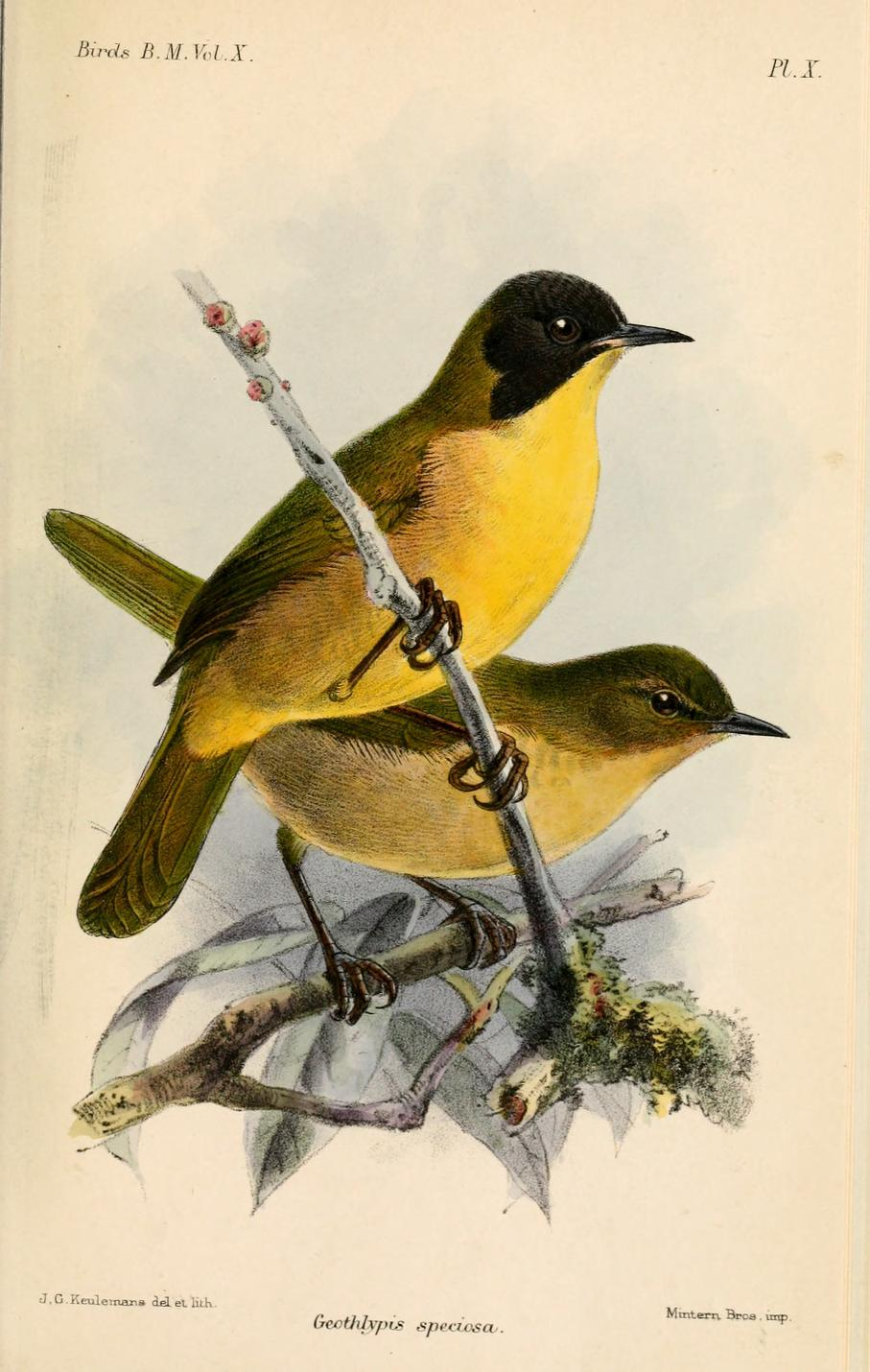
Illustration by John Gerrard Keulemans, 1885

== Description ==
The black-polled yellowthroat is 12.5 to 13 cm (4.9 to 5.1 in) long and weighs 9.5 to 12 g (0.34 to 0.42 oz). The species is sexually dimorphic. Adult males of the nominate subspecies have a dusky blackish crown that merges into a black mask that extends onto the ear coverts. Their nape, upperparts, wings, and tail are warm brownish olive. Their throat and underparts are a rich yellow with a brownish cinnamon or ochre wash on the breast and flanks. Females have a mostly dark olive-gray head with a paler supercilium and stripe above the lores. Their upperparts, wings, and tail are dark grayish. Their underparts are a rich yellow with a heavy olive-brown wash on the breast, flanks, and belly. Their underparts' feathers when fresh have buffy ochraceous edges. Males of subspecies G. s. limnatis have somewhat greener (less brown) upperparts than the nominate, and their underparts' wash is yellowish olive to buffy olive rather than the nominate's shades of brown. Females are also greener above and more olive below than the nominate. Both sexes of both subspecies have a dark iris, a blackish bill, and dark brownish legs and feet.

== Distribution and habitat ==
The black-polled yellowthroat is a bird of the central Trans-Mexican Volcanic Belt. The nominate subspecies is found in the State of México. Subspecies G. s. limnatis is found to its northwest in northern Michoacán and southern Guanajuato states. The range of neither is continuous. The species primarily inhabits lake marshes with cattail (Typha) and bullrush (Scirpus) and also other wet landscapes such as swamps, floodplains, and wetlands in the uplands. In elevation it ranges between 1,750 and 2,500 m (5,700 and 8,200 ft).

== Behavior ==
=== Movement ===
The black-polled yellowthroat is a year-round resident.

=== Feeding ===
The black-polled yellowthroat feeds mostly on insects and other arthropods but details are lacking. It usually forages singly or in pairs and is assumed to take most prey by gleaning in dense low vegetation.

=== Breeding ===
The black-polled yellowthroat's breeding season has not been defined but includes at least May to September. Nothing else is known about the species' breeding biology.

=== Vocalization ===
The black-polled yellowthroat's song is "a distinctive series of loud ringing notes on one pitch, usually changing mid-way through into descending drier chips, e.g., chree-chree-chree-chree-chree…chi-chi-chi-chi-chi or chree-chree-chree-chree-chree… chee-chee-chee-chee-chee". Its calls are described as "a dry trrk, a loud rasping chick, a slightly nasal chreh, and a more liquid chwik".

== Status ==
The IUCN originally in 1988 assessed the black-polled yellowthroat as Threatened, then in 1994 as Vulnerable, in 2000 as Endangered, and since 2020 again as Vulnerable. It is known from only five sites; its estimated population of between 1500 and 7000 mature individuals is believed to be decreasing. "G. speciosa does not tolerate habitat modification, and thus the most severe threat is the loss of its wetland habitats. The marshes within its range have been greatly reduced in size, having been drained and planted with crops."
