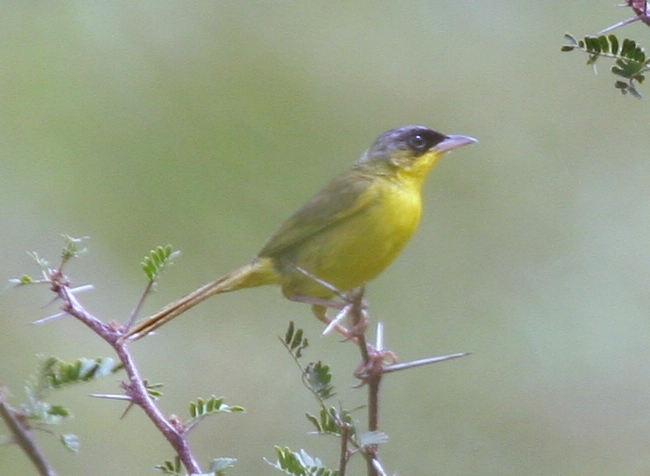

Conservation status
- Least Concern (IUCN 3.1)

Scientific classification
- Kingdom: Animalia
- Phylum: Chordata
- Class: Aves
- Order: Passeriformes
- Family: Parulidae
- Genus: Geothlypis
- Species: G. poliocephala

Binomial name
- Geothlypis poliocephala Baird, 1865

= Grey-crowned yellowthroat =

Species of bird

The grey-crowned yellowthroat (Geothlypis poliocephala) is a species of bird in the family Parulidae, the New World warblers. It is found from Mexico to Panama.

== Taxonomy and systematics ==
The black-polled yellowthroat was formally described in 1859 with its current binomial Geothlypis poliocephala. Some authors have placed the species in the monotypic genus Chamaethlypis but genetic data do not support this treatment.

The grey-crowned yellowthroat has these six subspecies:

- G. p. poliocephala Baird, 1865
- G. p. ralphi Ridgway, 1894
- G. p. palpebralis Ridgway, 1887
- G. p. caninucha Ridgway, 1872
- G. p. icterotis Ridgway, 1889
- G. p. ridgwayi (Griscom, 1930)

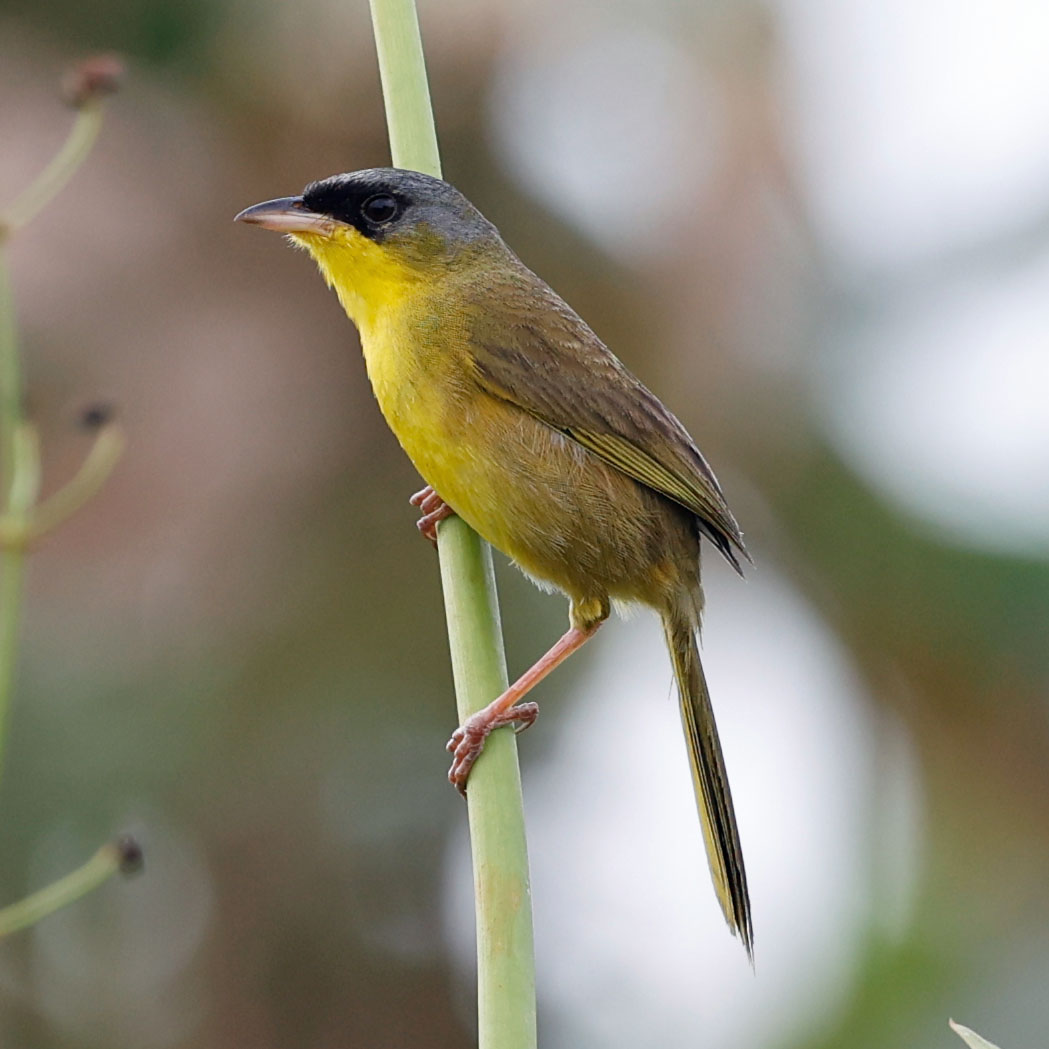
Adult near Los Robles in Costa Rica, 13 March 2024.

== Description ==
The grey-crowned yellowthroat is about 14 cm (5.5 in) long and weighs about 13 to 16 g (0.46 to 0.56 oz). The species is sexually dimorphic. It has a long graduated tail and a stout bill with a visibly curved culmen. Adult males of the nominate subspecies G. p. poliocephala have a mostly olive-gray head with a gray crown, black lores, and white crescents above and below the eye. Their nape, upperparts, wings, and tail are grayish olive-brown. Their throat, breast, and undertail coverts are yellow, their flanks washed with buff, and their belly yellowish white. Females have grayish lores, yellowish white eye crescents, and a brownish olive wash on the rest of the head. Their upper- and underparts are like the male's.

The other subspecies differ from the nominate and each other thus:

- G. p. ralphi: grayer upperparts and tail and paler and whiter underparts
- G. p. palpebralis: male has darker crown; both sexes more olive above and richer yellow below
- G. p. caninucha: similar to palpebralis but no eye crescents and more black on face
- G. p. icterotis: more olive above and richer yellow below but duller overall; olive-gray crown
- G. p. ridgwayi: similar to caninucha but greener above and brighter yellow below

Both sexes of all subspecies have a dark iris, a blackish bill, and dark brownish legs and feet.

== Distribution and habitat ==
The subspecies of the grey-crowned yellowthroat are found thus:

- G. p. poliocephala: Pacific slope of Mexico from northern Sinaloa south to extreme western Oaxaca
- G. p. ralphi: Gulf slope of Mexico in Tamaulipas and San Luis Potosí (but see below)
- G. p. palpebralis: from Veracruz and the Yucatán Peninsula south on the Caribbean slope through Belize, Guatemala, Honduras, and Nicaragua into northern Costa Rica
- G. p. caninucha: from eastern Oaxaca south on the Pacific slope through Guatemala and El Salvador into Honduras
- G. p. icterotis: Pacific slope of Nicaragua to central Costa Rica
- G. p. ridgwayi: southwestern Costa Rica into western Panama's Chiriquí Province

Subspecies G. p. ralphi was formerly resident in extreme southern Texas; "today it is only a very rare straggler there".

The grey-crowned yellowthroat inhabits semi-arid to damp grassy landscapes such as shrubby fields, hedgerows, scrublands, savanna, and sugarcane plantations. In elevation it is mostly between sea level and 1,500 m (4,900 ft) but locally reaches about 2,000 m (6,600 ft). It reaches 1,750 m (5,700 ft) in northern Central America.

== Behavior ==
=== Movement ===
The grey-crowned yellowthroat is a year-round resident but for its rare vagrancy to Texas.

=== Feeding ===
The grey-crowned yellowthroat feeds on insects and other invertebrates. It usually forages by gleaning in low vegetation though sometimes on the ground.

=== Breeding ===
The grey-crowned yellowthroat's breeding season has not been fully defined but spans at least from April to July. Its nest is a deep cup made from grass lined with finer grass and hair. It typically is placed in dense vegetation near the ground. The clutch is usually two eggs in the southern part of its range and up to four further north. Nothing else is known about the species' breeding biology.

=== Vocalization ===
The grey-crowned yellowthroat's range-wide song is "a long rich series of varied and jumbled musical phrases". It also has some regional second songs, in Mexico "a series of rich rising and falling whistles" and in Costa Rica "a series of rapidly delivered clear whistled notes accelerating into [a] descending trill". Its calls include "a high-pitched, grating cheed-l-eet, [a] descending series of three-syllable notes e.g. as peet-a-loo, peet-a-loo, peet-a-loo,...a loud slapping chack, and a chee".

== Status ==
The IUCN has assessed the grey-crowned yellowthroat as being of Least Concern. It has a very large range; its estimated population of at least 500,000 mature individuals is believed to be decreasing. No immediate threats have been identified. It is considered fairly common in northern Central America but rare in the lowlands on the Pacific side. It is "common and widespread" in Costa Rica.
