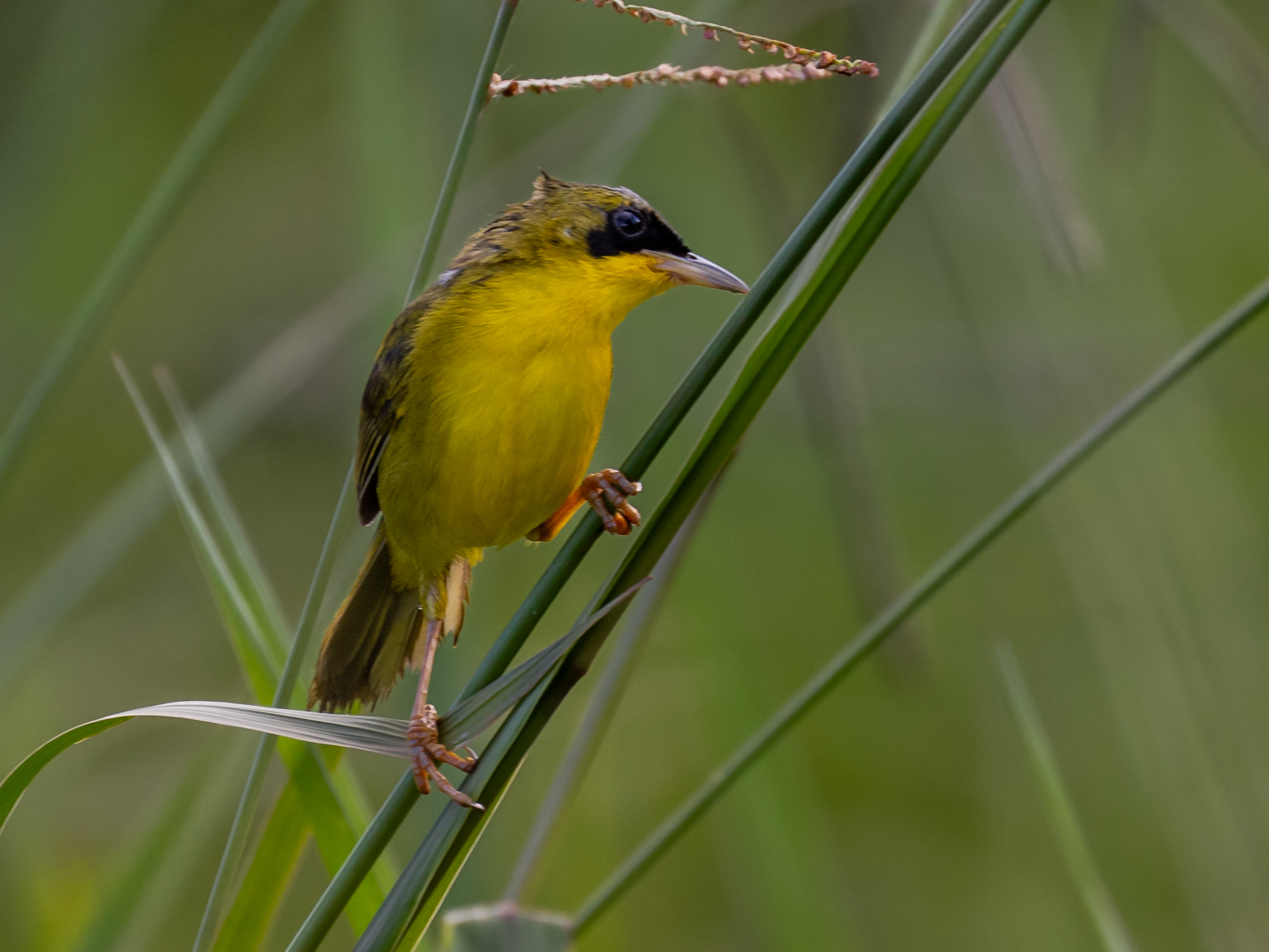
- Male

Conservation status
- Least Concern (IUCN 3.1)

Scientific classification
- Kingdom: Animalia
- Phylum: Chordata
- Class: Aves
- Order: Passeriformes
- Family: Parulidae
- Genus: Geothlypis
- Species: G. aequinoctialis

Binomial name
- Geothlypis aequinoctialis (Gmelin, 1789)

= Masked yellowthroat =

Species of bird

The masked yellowthroat (Geothlypis aequinoctialis) is a species of bird in the family Parulidae, the New World warblers. It is found in Brazil, Colombia, French Guiana, Guyana, Suriname, Trinidad, and Venezuela.

== Taxonomy and systematics ==
The masked yellowthroat was formally described in 1789 with the binomial Motacilla aequinoctialis, erroneously classing it as a wagtail but calling it the "equatorial warbler".

The masked yellowthroat's taxonomic history since its description is complicated and not yet resolved. Well into the twenty-first century taxonomists included up to five subspecies in it. In 2015 the IOC reclassified two of them as the black-lored yellowthroat (Geothlypis auricularis), a third as the southern yellowthroat (G. velata), and the fourth as the Chiriqui yellowthroat (G. chiriquensis), leaving the masked yellowthroat as monotypic. As of early 2026 it retains these four species.

In 2017 BirdLife International's Handbook of the Birds of the World (HBW) separated the black-lored and Chiriqui yellowthroats as species but retained velata as a subspecies of the masked yellowthroat. As of late 2025 it retains this three-species treatment.

In 2018 the American Ornithological Society (AOS) and Clements taxonomy separated chiriquensis but assigned it as a subspecies of the olive-crowned yellowthroat (G. semiflava) rather than as a full species. As of late 2025 they retain it there. The AOS took no further action because the remaining subspecies of the masked yellowthroat are in South America and therefore outside its jurisdiction. In 2022 Clements recognized the black-lored and southern yellowthroats as the same two species that the IOC had earlier named. As a result of these splits and the earlier transfer of chiriquensis, as of late 2025 Clements treats the masked yellowthroat as monotypic. The initial version of AviList in 2025 mirrors the Clements structure.

The South American Classification Committee does not recognize the southern or black-lored yellowthroats as species but retains them as subspecies of the masked yellowthroat. It does not address chiriqui because it is a solely Central American taxon.

This article follows the IOC/Clements/AviList monotypic species model.

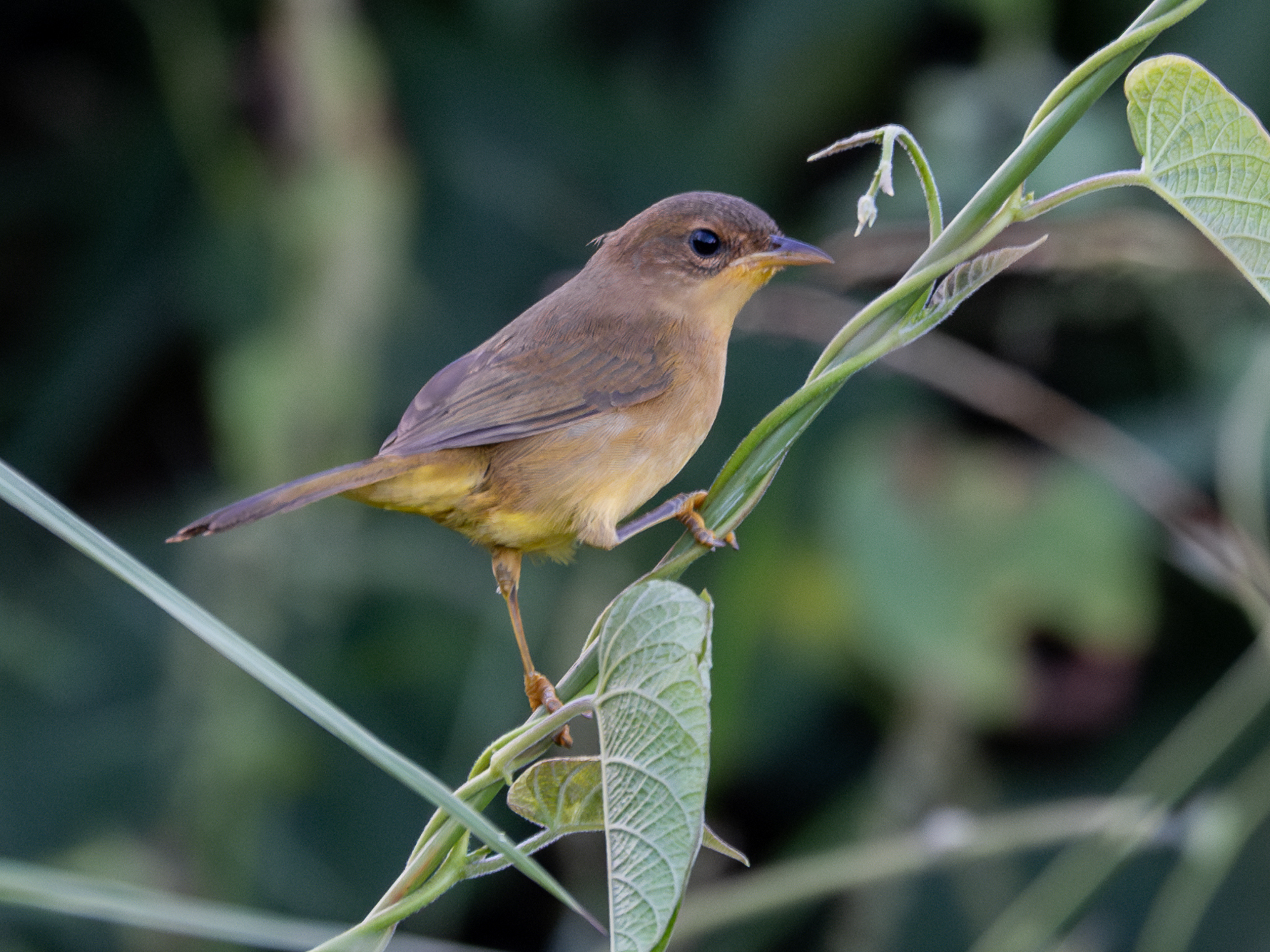
Female

== Description ==
The masked yellowthroat is 12.7 to 14 cm (5.0 to 5.5 in) long and weighs 11 to 15 g (0.39 to 0.53 oz). The species is sexually dimorphic. Adult males have a wide black mask from their forehead and forecrown around the eye and including the ear coverts. They have a pale slate-gray crown. Their nape and upperparts are yellow-olive. Their flight feathers' upper surface is brown with olive-green edges and the lower surface plain brown. Their upperwing coverts are brownish with yellow-olive margins. Their tail's upper surface is yellow-olive and its lower surface yellow-green. Their throat and underparts are bright yellow with sometimes a light olive-gray wash on the flanks. Females have no black or gray on their head. Their lores and area around the eye are dull yellow. Their upperparts are duller and browner than the male's and their underparts are also more subdued. Both sexes have a dark brown to grayish brown iris, a blackish maxilla, a pinkish horn mandible, and pinkish to yellowish legs and feet that can have a darker wash.

== Distribution and habitat ==
The masked yellowthroat has a [disjunct distribution] with two main ranges. The smaller is from Cundinamarca Department in central Colombia north along the lower slopes of the Central Andes and into western Venezuela's Zulia and Táchira states. The larger extends from Colombia's Meta Department north and across most of central and northern Venezuela and the northern parts of the Guianas to the mouth of the Amazon in northern Brazil's Pará state and perhaps into Maranhão. From there its range extends west along the Amazon to approximately the middle of Amazonas state. The species also is found on Trinidad but not Tobago.

The masked yellowthroat inhabits a variety of damp to wet landscapes including damp grasslands, thickets in marshy areas and forest edges and clearings, seasonally flooded savanna, and islands and shores along the Amazon. It also occurs in human-modified habitats like sugar cane and oil palm plantations and sewage treatment wetlands. In elevation it is found up to 500 m (1,640 ft) in Colombia and up to 900 m (3,000 ft) in Venezuela.

== Behavior ==
=== Movement ===
The masked yellowthroat appears to be a year-round resident throughout its range.

=== Feeding ===
The masked yellowthroat's diet is not well known but appears to be almost entirely small invertebrates. Caterpillars, dragonflies, damselflies, grasshoppers, beetles, and spiders have all been identified as components. It forages singly or in pairs and usually in dense vegetation where it apparently takes prey mostly by gleaning.

=== Breeding ===
The masked yellowthroat's breeding season has not been defined. In Trinidad breeding activity has been noted in most months, "suggesting the possibility of year-round breeding" but appears to be concentrated between October and December. Reports from mainland South American countries are too scattered in time to name its season(s) there. Nests are known only from Trinidad. They were cups made from leaves, twigs, and other plant material and placed not far above the ground hidden in dense vegetation of a shrub, vine tangle, or tree. The clutches were of three to five eggs that were white with darker flecks. The female alone incubated, for about 13 days. Fledging occurred about 10 days after hatch and both parents provisioned nestlings.

=== Vocalization ===
The male masked yellowthroat sings a "short sweet warble of about 2 [seconds] long, that has been transcribed as tee-chee-chee teecheweet teecheweet". It has a long call, a "melodious descending series of some 20 notes with a total duration of ⁓3 [seconds]". Both sexes make a "short raspy note prew or chrew". Most song is in the morning.

== Status ==
The IUCN follows HBW taxonomy and so has not assessed the masked yellowthroat sensu stricto separately from the southern yellowthroat. The species is considered common in Colombia, "fairly common but local" in Venezuela, and "frequent to uncommon" in Brazil. "Masked Yellowthroat is a bird of disturbed habitats [so it is] probable that local populations may actually benefit from anthropogenic disturbance." It is found in a few protected areas.

== Additional reading ==
- New World Warblers by Curson, Quinn and Beadle, ISBN 0-7136-3932-6
- ffrench, Richard (1991). A Guide to the Birds of Trinidad and Tobago (2nd ed.). Comstock Publishing. ISBN 0-8014-9792-2.
- A guide to the birds of Costa Rica by Stiles and Skutch ISBN 0-8014-9600-4
