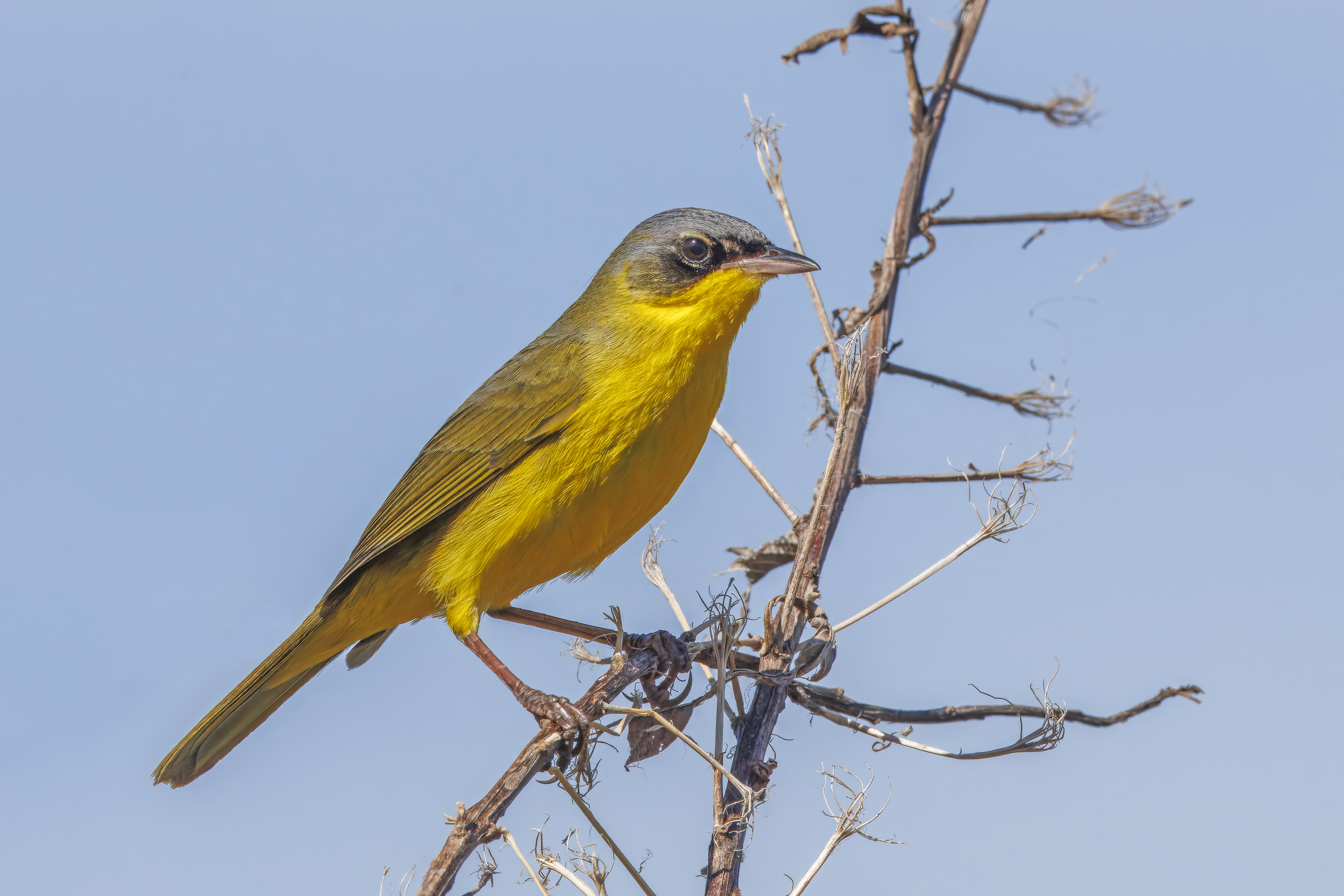
- Female in Colonia del Sacramento, Uruguay

Scientific classification
- Kingdom: Animalia
- Phylum: Chordata
- Class: Aves
- Order: Passeriformes
- Family: Parulidae
- Genus: Geothlypis
- Species: G. velata

Binomial name
- Geothlypis velata (Vieillot, 1809)

= Southern yellowthroat =

Species of bird

The southern yellowthroat (Geothlypis velata) is a species of bird in the family Parulidae, the New World warblers. It is found in Argentina, Bolivia, Brazil, Paraguay, Peru, and Uruguay.

== Taxonomy and systematics ==
The southern yellowthroat was formally described in 1809 with the binomial Sylvia velata, mistakenly classing it with the Old World warblers.

The southern yellowthroat's taxonomy is not yet resolved. Well into the twenty-first century it was treated as a subspecies of the masked yellowthroat (Geothlypis aequinoctialis). In 2015 the IOC recognized it again as a full species and in 2022 the Clements taxonomy followed suit. The initial version of AviList in 2025 also treats it as a species. However, as of late 2025 and early 2026, respectively, BirdLife International's Handbook of the Birds of the World (HBW) and the South American Classification Committee retain it as a subspecies of the masked yellowthroat.

== Description ==
The southern yellowthroat is 13 to 14.3 cm (5.1 to 5.6 in) long and weighs 11 to 17 g (0.39 to 0.60 oz). The species is sexually dimorphic. Adult males have a wide black mask from their forehead and forecrown around the eye and including the ear coverts. They have a pale slate-gray crown. Their nape, upperparts, and tail are yellowish green to olive green. The upper surface of their flight feathers is yellowish green to olive green with dark brown inner webs; the lower surface is brown. Their throat and underparts are bright yellow with a very light olive wash on the flanks. Females have no black on their head. They have a pale yellow-white stripe above the lores and an eye-ring of the same color. Their crown and ear coverts have a gray wash. Their upperparts and underparts are like the male's but with a stronger olive wash on the flanks. Both sexes have a dark brown to grayish brown iris, a blackish maxilla, a pinkish horn to gray mandible with a pale base, and legs and feet of highly variable color.

== Distribution and habitat ==
The southern yellowthroat is found from Cuzco Department in southeastern Peru east through northern Bolivia and into Brazil. In Brazil it is found south of a line roughly from Acre east to the Atlantic in northern Bahia. Its range extends south through eastern Bolivia, all of Paraguay and Uruguay, and into northern Argentina as far as northern Buenos Aires Province.

The southern yellowthroat inhabits a wide variety of landscapes that range from somewhat dry to humid. At the drier end of the scale it is found in caatinga, the dry woodlands of the Gran Chaco, and in Bolivia the deciduous Yungas forest. Wetter habitats include damp grasslands, marshes, seasonally flooded savanna, and Araucaria moist forests. In some areas it favors dense undergrowth in forest clearings and edges. In addition it is found in human-altered landscapes such as cut-over woodlots and suburban areas. In elevation it ranges from sea level to 1,500 m (4,900 ft) in Brazil and reaches 2,200 m (7,200 ft) in Peru.

== Behavior ==
=== Movement ===
In most of its range the southern yellowthroat is a year-round resident. Details of its movements are scarce, but the far southernmost population moves north for the austral winter. It may only overwinter in Peru.

=== Feeding ===
The southern yellowthroat feeds almost exclusively on small invertebrates. Isoptera, Hemiptera, Coleoptera, Hymenoptera, and Formicidae are known components of its diet. It forages singly or in pairs, taking most prey by gleaning in dense vegetation. It has also been observed taking winged termites in mid-air.

=== Breeding ===
The southern yellowthroat's breeding season in Argentina is concentrated in November to January. "Breeding evidence from other portions of Southern Yellowthroat’s range [are] scattered and incomplete". The species' nest is a messy open cup made from fairly rough plant materials lined with softer, finer plant and animal fibers. They are attached to sedges, cattails, other similar standing vegetation, and in shrubs, and usually placed within 0.5 m (2 ft) of the ground. Most clutches are of three eggs though two to four are known. The eggs are white with darker flecks and blotches. The female alone incubates, for about 13 to 14 days. Fledging occurs 10 to 11 days after hatch. The shiny cowbird (Molothrus bonariensis) is a brood parasite.

=== Vocalization ===
The southern yellowthroat's song has been described as high and sweet, starting with two slow introductory notes followed by two short, lilting, notes, and "ending in a distinct flourish". It is written as "swee swee feedeweet-feedeweet-wu-wutweet or variations thereof". The species also has a "long call", a "melodious descending series of some 8‒16 notes" that starts buzzy and becomes more musical. It also has a "strident buzzy descending note tzeeuw" and a "short raspy note prew or chrew". Only males sing and give the long call, and most song is in the morning. Both sexes give the shorter calls.

== Status ==
The IUCN follows HBW taxonomy and so has not assessed the southern yellowthroat separately from the masked yellowthroat sensu stricto. It is considered uncommon in Peru, "frequent to uncommon" in the northern half of its Brazilian range, "common to frequent" in the southern half, and common in the rest of its range. "Southern Yellowthroat is a bird of disturbed habitats [so it is] probable that local populations may actually benefit from anthropogenic disturbance." It is found in many protected areas throughout its range.
