= Lyman Belding =

American ornithologist

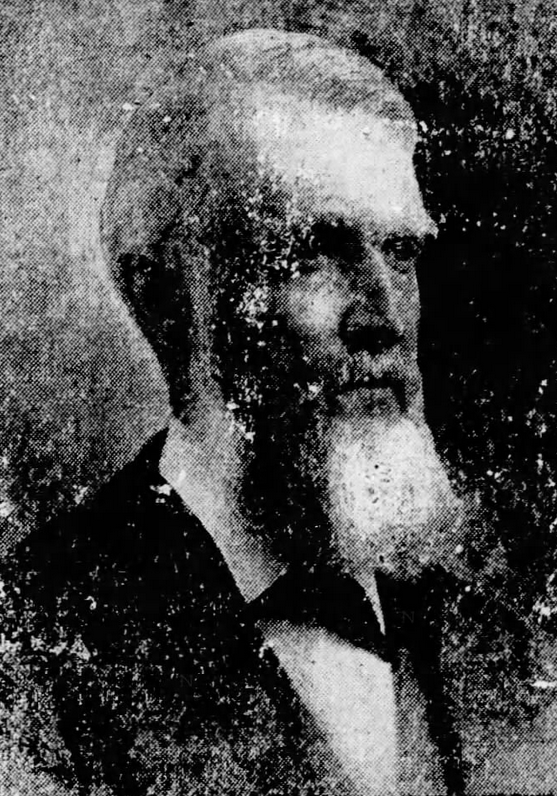
- Born: June 12, 1829; West Farms, Massachusetts
- Died: November 22, 1917 (aged 88); Stockton, California
- Occupation: Ornithologist

Lyman Belding (June 12, 1829 – November 22, 1917) was a prominent American ornithologist.

== Biography ==
Lyman Belding was born to Joshua Belding and Rosetta Cooley Belding on June 12, 1829, at West Farms, Massachusetts, but later moved to Kingston, Pennsylvania when he was about 7 years old, and finally to California. He spent many years on whaling ships, but became fascinated by birds after acquiring his first bird book in 1876.

By then he retired in Stockton, California and became a foremost authority on the avifauna of California and Baja California. He died in Stockton on November 22, 1917, and is buried there in the Rural Cemetery.

== Legacy ==
Belding's yellowthroat (Geothlypis beldingi ) was named in his honor by Robert Ridgway.

Belding's orange-throated whiptail (Aspidoscelis hyperythrus beldingi), a subspecies of lizard, was named in his honour by Leonhard Stejneger.

In addition to his work as a self-taught ornithologist, Belding made a contribution to Baja California anthropology. In 1882–1883, he joined with the Dutch anthropologist Herman ten Kate in exploring the Cape Region at the peninsula's southern extremity. In 1885, Belding published an article describing their largely unsuccessful efforts at locating descendants of the region's native Pericú inhabitants and their more successful discoveries of caves containing distinctive secondary, painted burials.
