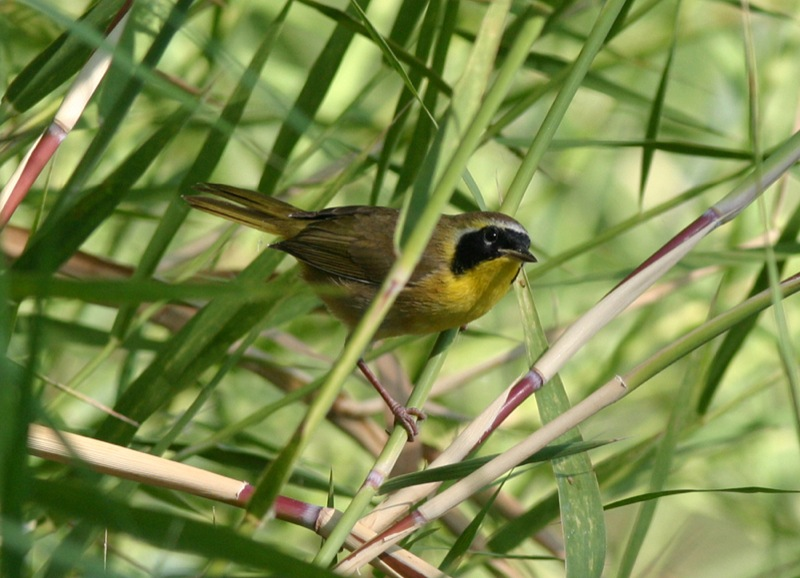

Conservation status
- Vulnerable (IUCN 3.1)

Scientific classification
- Kingdom: Animalia
- Phylum: Chordata
- Class: Aves
- Order: Passeriformes
- Family: Parulidae
- Genus: Geothlypis
- Species: G. beldingi

Binomial name
- Geothlypis beldingi Ridgway, 1882

= Belding's yellowthroat =

Species of bird

Belding's yellowthroat (Geothlypis beldingi) is a Vulnerable species of bird in the family Parulidae, the New World warblers. It is endemic to Mexico.

== Taxonomy and systematics ==
Belding's yellowthroat was formally described in 1882 with its current binomial Geothlypis beldingi. The species' specific epithet, and later its English name, honor Lyman Belding, the California naturalist "who has had the good fortune to discover it". Its closest relative is the widespread common yellowthroat (G. trichas).

Belding's yellowthroat has two subspecies, the nominate G. b. beldingi (Ridgway, 1882) and G. b. goldmani (Oberholser, 1917).

== Description ==
Belding's yellowthroat is about 14 cm (5.5 in) long. It weighs an average of 14 to 15 g (0.49 to 0.53 oz). The species is sexually dimorphic. Adult males of the nominate subspecies have a large black mask from the forehead past the eye to the side of the neck. It is bordered top and back with a yellow band. They have an olive crown and the rest of their head is yellow. Their upperparts are olive. Their wing and tail feathers have dusky inner webs and bright olive-yellow edges. Their chin, throat, and underparts are bright yellow with an olive wash on the flanks. Females have no black on their face. They have a grayish brown crown and a mostly yellow-olive face with whitish to pale yellow arcs above and below the eye and a dusky wash on the ear coverts. Their upperparts are olive with some grayish brown and their wings and tail are like the male's. Their chin, throat, breast, and upper belly are deep yellow that becomes buff-yellow to white in the center of the belly. Their sides and flanks have a brown to brownish olive wash. Subspecies G. b. goldmani is larger than the nominate and has a larger bill. Males have a grayish white or cream band above the mask instead of the nominate's yellow. Their upperparts are slightly grayer, their underparts paler, and their flanks browner than the nominate's. Females have a browner back than the nominate and a mild brownish tint on the belly. Both sexes of both subspecies have a dark brown iris and pinkish to pinkish brown legs and feet. Males have a black bill that in the non-breeding season is yellow at the base of the tomia. Females' bills are blackish with gray or brownish tomia in the non-breeding season.

== Distribution and habitat ==
Belding's yellowthroat is a bird of Baja California Sur. Subspecies G. b. goldmani is the more northerly of the two. It is found from near San Ignacio south to near San Javier. The nominate is found from La Paz south to Cabo San Lucas. It primarily inhabits desert oases whose freshwater marshes have cattail (Typha domingensis), common reed (Phragmites australis), and similar plants. "It has been recorded in human-made sites such as sewage ponds, golf courses, and orchards". In the non-breeding season it sometimes has been found in orchards, mangroves, and brackish marshes. It ranges in elevation from sea level to about 550 m (1,800 ft).

== Behavior ==
=== Movement ===
Belding's yellowthroat is not a conventional migrant, but many individuals seem to disperse away from marshes during the non-breeding season.

=== Feeding ===
Belding's yellowthroat feeds on a wide variety of insects, spiders, and other invertebrates. It does not appear to favor any particular prey but opportunistically takes what is available. It typically forages in pairs during the breeding season and singly outside it. It gleans some prey from the marsh vegetation and also takes flying insects like damselflies and mosquitos in mid-air.

=== Breeding ===
The breeding season of Belding's yellowthroat has not been fully defined but includes May and June. Its nest is a cup made from cattail leaves woven to the stalks of live marsh vegetation; it is lined with finer fibers and horsehair. The clutch is usually two to three eggs though clutches of four are known. The eggs are white with dark spots and lines. The incubation period and time to fledging are not known. Both parents provision nestlings but other details of parental care are not known.

=== Vocalization ===
The song of Belding's yellowthroat is written as "wi te-wich-uh". It is described as similar to the common yellowthroat's "but fuller, deeper and more powerful, sometimes with buzzy notes admixed, and phrasing slightly different". Its usual call is "a dry djip" that like the song is fuller and deeper than the common yellowthroat's.

== Status ==
The IUCN originally in 1988 assessed Belding's yellowthroat as being of Least Concern, then in 1994 as Vulnerable, in 2000 as Critically Endangered, in 2011 as Endangered, and since 2017 again as Vulnerable. Though its overall range spans 57,600 km^{2} (22,200 sq mi), its distribution is highly fragmented and it actually occupies a total of only about 3,000 km^{2} (1,200 sq mi). Its estimated population of between 650 and 1670 mature individuals is believed to be decreasing. "The oases of Baja California are under high human pressure, especially in the south. Accidental and induced fires, reed-cutting for tourism facilities and house construction, and drainage for agriculture and cattle-ranching have decreased suitable habitat." "Urban and agricultural expansion...are leading to a high demand for water and potential abstraction of surface water in the wetlands occupied by the species [and in addition] groundwater may drop as a consequence of higher drought frequency in the course of climate change."
