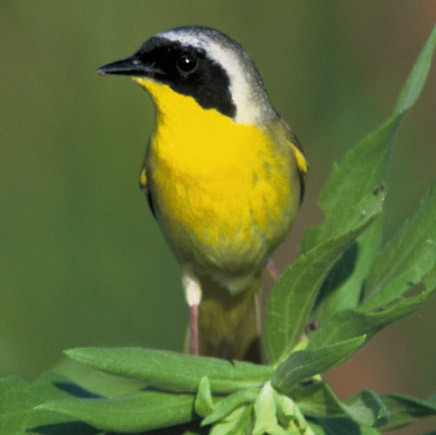
- Male common yellowthroat (Geothlypis trichas)

Scientific classification
- Kingdom: Animalia
- Phylum: Chordata
- Class: Aves
- Order: Passeriformes
- Family: Parulidae
- Genus: Geothlypis; Cabanis, 1847

Type species
- Trichas personatus Swainson, 1827 = Turdus trichas Linnaeus, 1766

Species
- See text.

= Yellowthroat =

Yellowthroats

Genus of birds

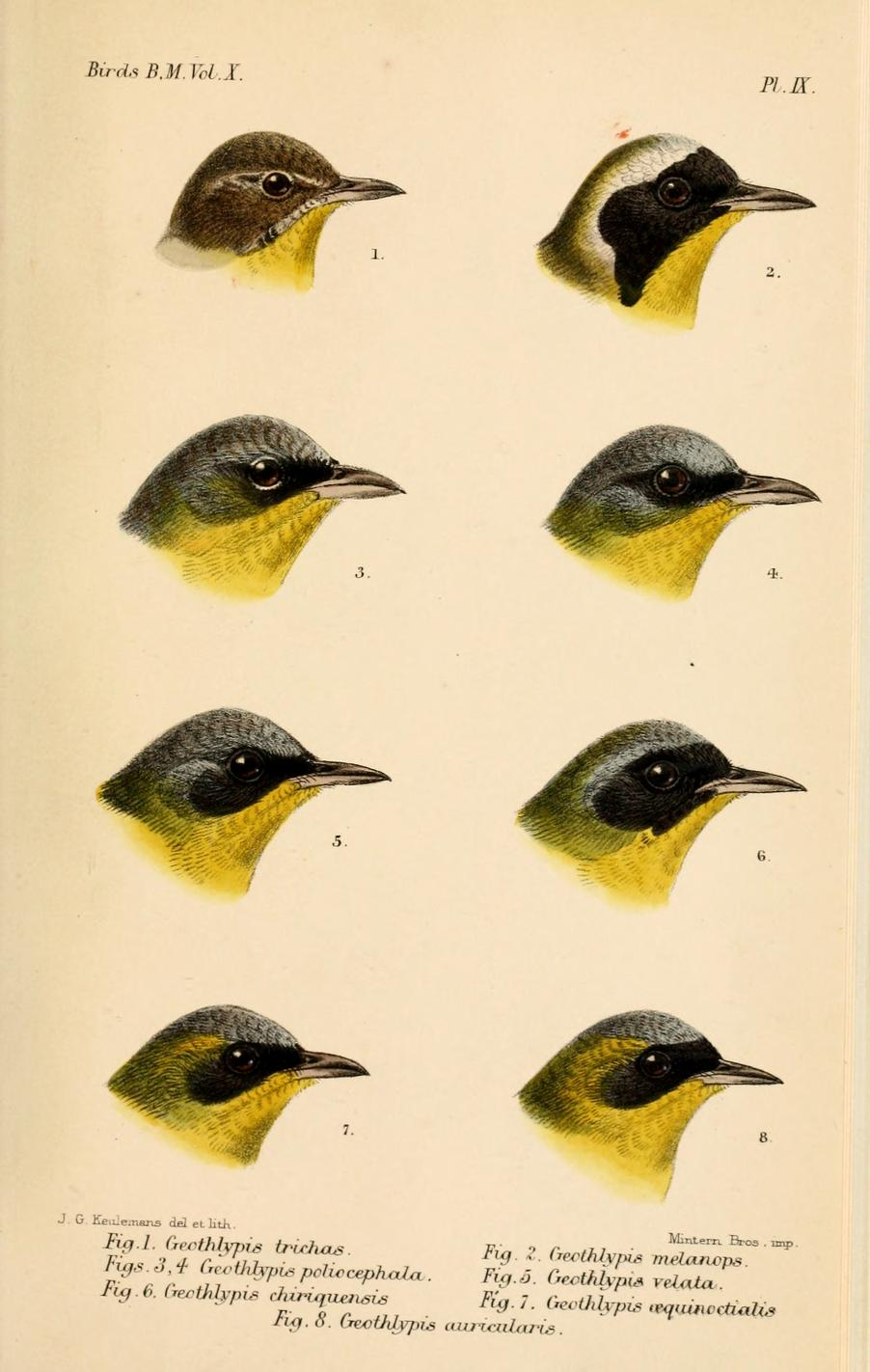
Heads of Geothlypis taxa

The yellowthroats are New World warblers in the genus Geothlypis. Most members of the group have localised ranges in Mexico and Central America, but the masked yellowthroat has an extensive South American distribution, while the common yellowthroat breeds over much of North America.

== Taxonomy ==
The genus Geothlypis was introduced in 1847 by the German ornithologist Jean Cabanis. This was a replacement name for Trichas that had been introduced in June 1827 by William Swainson but was pre-occupied by Trichas that had been introduced in March 1827 by C. L. Gloger for a genus in a different family. Swainson had introduced his genus to accommodate a single species, Tichas personatus Swainson. This is the type species and is a junior synonym of Turdus trichas Linnaeus, the common yellowthroat. The genus name Geothlypis combines the Ancient Greek γεω-/geō- meaning "ground-" or "earth-" with θλυπις/thlupis, an unknown small bird.

The taxonomy of these closely related species is complicated, and it is sometimes difficult to define which forms merit species status. For example, common yellowthroat, Belding's yellowthroat, Altamira yellowthroat, and Bahama yellowthroat are sometimes considered conspecific. Conversely masked yellowthroat can be split to three or even four species. The name 'yellowthroat' is sometimes used as an alternate name for the yellow-throated leaflove.

The geographical isolation of the various populations of this mainly sedentary group has led to its genetic divergence and speciation. This process can be seen in action in the case of masked yellowthroat, where the subspecies are separated by rainforest or the Andes, leading to the development of distinctive forms, such as the Central American race Geothlypis aequinoctialis chiriquensis. This form is found in the highlands of Costa Rica and western Panama, and is separated by 1000 km from its South American cousins, from which it differs in size, appearance and vocalisations.

The Kentucky warbler, mourning warbler, and MacGillivray's warbler, all previously thought to have been members of the genus Oporornis, have since been moved to Geothlypis.

== Description ==
All the yellowthroats have similar plumage, with yellow-green upperparts, yellow breast, and a mainly black bill. The adult male has a black facemask of variable extent, usually bordered above with a grey band. The female is similar, but lacks the black mask, and may be duller in plumage.

== Behaviour ==
The breeding habitat of these warblers is typically marshes and other wet areas with dense low vegetation. The eggs, two in most species, but up to five for common yellowthroat, are laid in a lined cup nest low in grass or rank vegetation.

Yellowthroat are usually seen in pairs, and do not associate with other species. They are often skulking, and feed on a range of insects.

== Species ==
The genus contains the following 14 species.

Image	Scientific name	Common name	Distribution
	Geothlypis trichas	Common yellowthroat	southern Canada to central Mexico.
	Geothlypis beldingi	Belding's yellowthroat	southern Baja California, Mexico.
	Geothlypis flavovelata	Altamira yellowthroat	Gulf slope of northeastern Mexico
	Geothlypis rostrata	Bahama yellowthroat	the Bahamas.
	Geothlypis semiflava	Olive-crowned yellowthroat	Colombia, Costa Rica, Ecuador, Honduras, Mexico, Nicaragua, and Panama.
	Geothlypis speciosa	Black-polled yellowthroat	central Mexico and the southwestern Mexican Plateau, in Guanajuato, Michoacán, and México State.
	Geothlypis aequinoctialis	Masked yellowthroat	Venezuela and Colombia to n Amazonian Brazil and Trinidad
	Geothlypis auricularis	Black-lored yellowthroat	western Ecuador to western Peru
	Geothlypis velata	Southern yellowthroat	southeastern Peru, eastern Bolivia, and south Amazonian Brazil to Argentina and Uruguay
	Geothlypis poliocephala	Gray-crowned yellowthroat	Belize, Costa Rica, El Salvador, Guatemala, Honduras, Mexico, Nicaragua, Panama, and the United States.
	Geothlypis nelsoni	Hooded yellowthroat	Mexico north of the Isthmus of Tehuantepec.
	Geothlypis tolmiei	MacGillivray's warbler	western United States, and in boreal forests of west Canada.
	Geothlypis philadelphia	Mourning warbler	southern Canada, the central and eastern United States, Belize, Bonaire, Puerto Rico, Guatemala, Panama, and other Central American Islands
	Geothlypis formosa	Kentucky warbler	central and eastern United States, often ranging as far north as Wisconsin to Pennsylvania.

=== References ===
- Curson, Quinn and Beadle, New World Warblers ISBN 0-7136-3932-6
- Hilty, Birds of Venezuela ISBN 0-7136-6418-5
- Stiles and Skutch, A guide to the birds of Costa Rica ISBN 0-8014-9600-4
