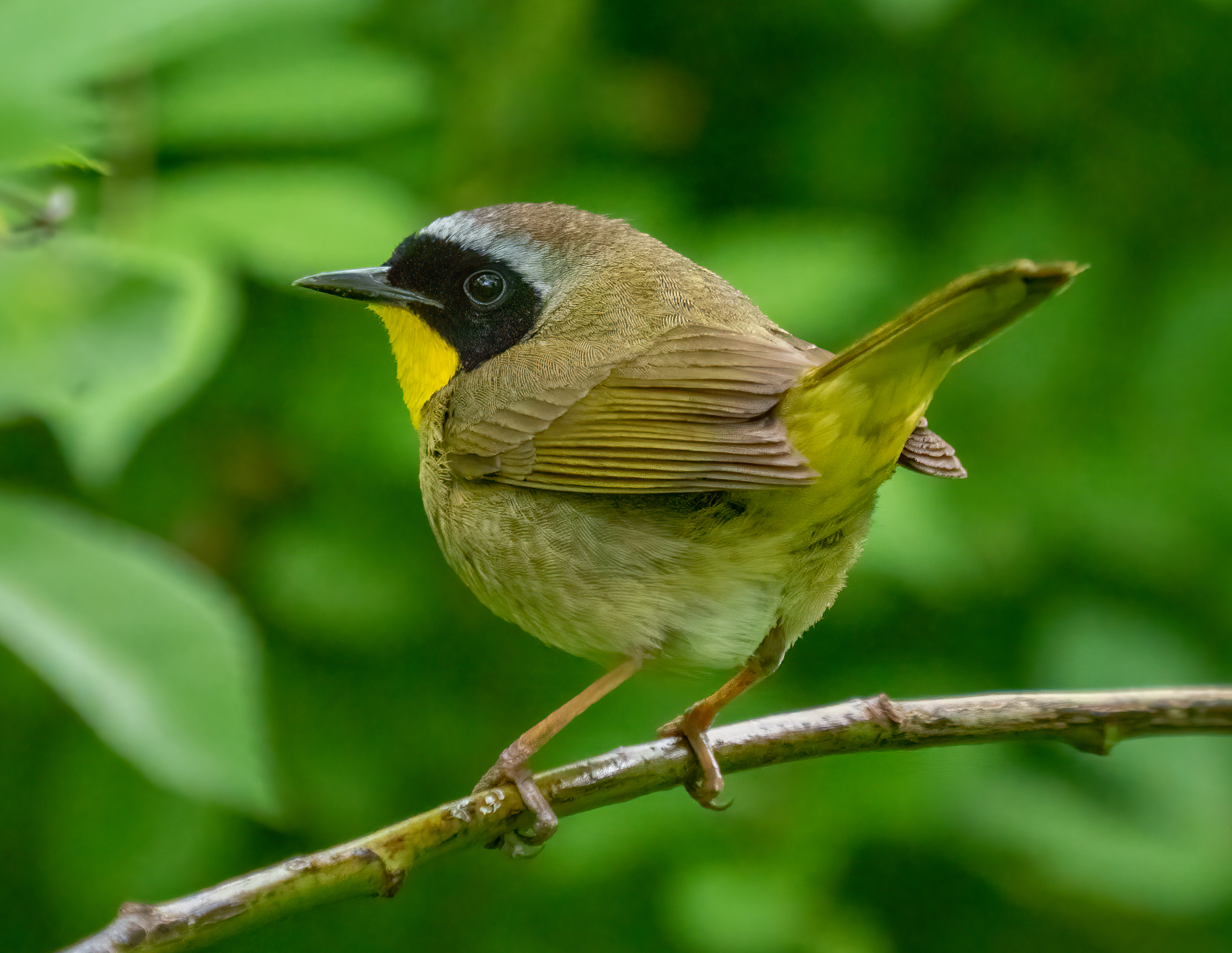
- Male
- Female

Conservation status
- Least Concern (IUCN 3.1)

Scientific classification
- Kingdom: Animalia
- Phylum: Chordata
- Class: Aves
- Order: Passeriformes
- Family: Parulidae
- Genus: Geothlypis
- Species: G. trichas

Binomial name
- Geothlypis trichas (Linnaeus, 1766)
- Range of G. trichas Breeding range Year-round range Wintering range

Synonyms
- Turdus trichas Linnaeus, 1766

= Common yellowthroat =

Common yellowthroat Temporal range: Pleistocene–present

Species of bird

Song and call

The common yellowthroat (Geothlypis trichas) is a New World warbler. It is an abundant breeder in North America, ranging from southern Canada to central Mexico. In the northern parts of its range the birds are migratory, wintering in the southern parts of the breeding range, Central America and the West Indies. Southern forms are largely resident. Historically, it has also been known as the "yellow bandit", Maryland yellow-throat, and yellow-breasted warbler.

== Taxonomy ==
The common yellowthroat was formally described in 1766 by the Swedish naturalist Carl Linnaeus in the twelfth edition of his Systema Naturae under the binomial name Turdus trichas. The specific epithet is from Ancient Greek τριχας/trikhas, τριχαδος/trikhados, a type of thrush. Linnaeus based his account on "The Maryland yellow-throat" that had been described and illustrated in 1758 by the English naturalist George Edwards in his book Gleanings of Natural History. Linnaeus specified the locality as North America but this was restricted to the state of Maryland by the American Ornithologists' Union in 1931. The common yellowthroat is now one of 15 species placed in the genus Geothlypis that was introduced in 1847 by the German ornithologist Jean Cabanis. The genus name combines the Ancient Greek γεω-/geō- meaning "ground-" or "earth-" with θλυπις/thlupis, an unknown small bird.

Thirteen subspecies are recognised:

- G. t. trichas (Linnaeus, 1766) – southeast Canada and east USA (except southeast)
- G. t. typhicola Burleigh, 1934 – inland southeast USA
- G. t. ignota Chapman, 1890 – coastal southeast USA
- G. t. insperata Van Tyne, 1933 – south Texas (central south USA)
- G. t. campicola Behle & Aldrich, 1947 – interior west Canada and northwest, central north USA
- G. t. arizela Oberholser, 1899 – coastal west Canada, west USA and northwest Mexico
- G. t. occidentalis Brewster, 1883 – central west USA
- G. t. sinuosa Grinnell, 1901 – north California (west USA)
- G. t. scirpicola Grinnell, 1901 – southwest USA and northwest Mexico
- G. t. chryseola Van Rossem, 1930 – southwest to central south USA and central west Mexico
- G. t. melanops Baird, SF, 1865 – central Mexico
- G. t. modesta Nelson, 1900 – west Mexico
- G. t. chapalensis Nelson, 1903 – Lake Chapala in Jalisco (central west Mexico)

== Description ==
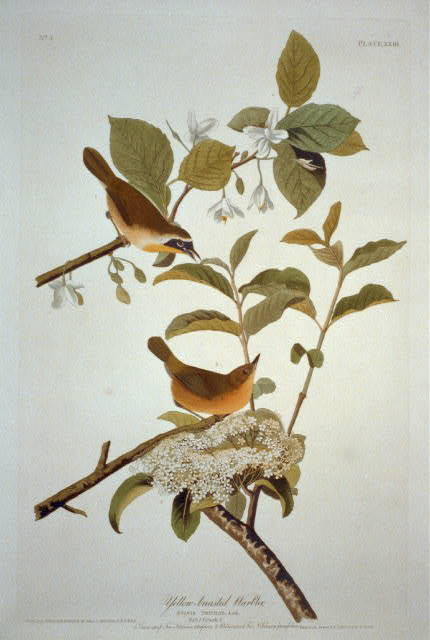
Common yellowthroat (as "Yellow-breasted Warbler") in The Birds of America by J. J. Audubon

Common yellowthroats are small songbirds that have olive backs, wings and tails, yellow throats and chests, and white bellies. Adult males have black face masks which stretch from the sides of the neck across the eyes and forehead, which are bordered above with white or gray. Females are similar in appearance, but have paler underparts and lack the black mask. Immature birds are similar in appearance to the adult female. First-year males have a faint black mask which darkens completely by spring.

The subspecies mainly differ in the males' facial patterns and the brightness of the yellow underparts. The southwestern subspecies of this bird are the brightest and the yellowest below.

The song is a loud twichety twichety twichety twich. Its call is a soft jip.

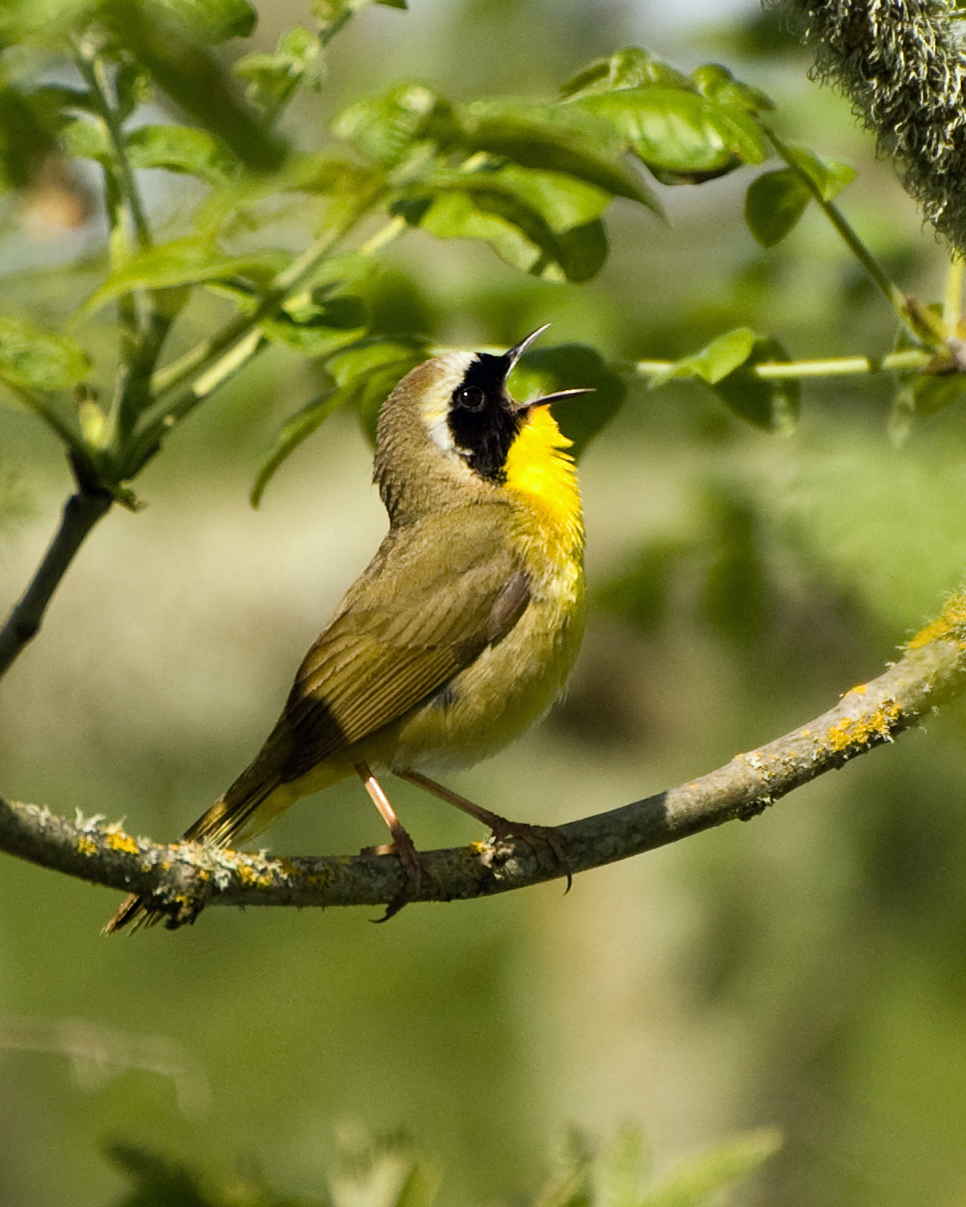
Singing male yellowthroat

Male singing

Measurements:

- Length: 11–13 cm (4.3–5.1 in)
- Wingspan: 15–19 cm (5.9–7.5 in)
- Weight: 7.6–15.5 g (0.27–0.55 oz)

== Distribution and habitat ==
Common yellowthroats breed in marshes and other wet areas with low, dense vegetation. They may also be found in other areas with dense shrubs, and are less commonly found in dry areas. Females appear to prefer males with larger masks. Common yellowthroats nest in low vegetation, laying 3–5 eggs in a cup-shaped nest. Both parents feed the young.

=== Migration ===
Northern subspecies are nocturnal migrants, wintering in the southern parts of the breeding range, Central America and the West Indies. Southern forms are largely resident. This species is a very rare vagrant to western Europe.

Routes of migration vary based on the season and location of common yellowthroats. During fall migration, from August to October, common yellowthroats in Canada, Western, Eastern, and Central U.S., and regions outside of the United States all have unique migration routes. When migrating in the fall months, all adults and immature individuals tend to arrive at their migration destinations around the same time. Migration differences in timing and routes are also seen during the spring months from early February to late May in these same groups across the United States, Canada, and other areas. However, males generally arrive at their destination site before the females during the spring migration months. During both fall and spring migration, many birds take time to rest during a stopover period. Some individuals stay at their stopover destinations for several weeks or months while others spend only a few days resting before they continue on in their migration patterns to their final destination.

One place of study on common yellowthroat migration that is unique and worth noting is Appledore Island, Maine. Common yellowthroats here typically migrate to this island during the spring months displaying distinct patterns of movement and stopover ecology. Analysis of common yellowthroat spring migration from April to June was observed to determine patterns of migration and time spent resting on the island before continuing on their journey. Birds returning for more than the second time arrive earlier than birds migrating to the island for their first time. Every year, males tend to arrive on the island an average of five days earlier than females weighing more than the females upon arrival. One possible explanation for the early arrival of males to this island is the ability of males to set up territories before the females arrive. This could give them better access to resources and a higher likelihood of finding a female. However, both sexes spend about a week on the island before leaving.

Migration of common yellowthroats in Florida has also been extensively studied. In Florida, the common yellowthroat can be found more often in the southern peninsular region rather than the northern panhandle region closer to the mainland of the United States. Peak migration times of the birds in this region are during the last week of September through the second week of October. Not as much is known about spring migration in Florida, but the patterns appear similar to that of the autumn migration.

== Behaviour and ecology ==
These birds feed on insects, which are usually captured in dense vegetation, but sometimes caught in midair.

Common yellowthroat nests are commonly subject to brood parasitism by the brown-headed cowbird (Molothrus ater).

== Conservation status ==
Despite a decline in numbers, which is due to loss of favored habitat, this species is still very common.
