= List of birds of Sri Lanka =

Sri Lanka is a tropical island situated close to the southern tip of India. The bird life of Sri Lanka is very rich for its size and more than 460 species have been recorded. In addition to the many resident birds, a considerable number of migratory species winter in the country to escape their northern breeding grounds.

A total of 35 bird species are confirmed as endemic, the latest addition being the Sri Lanka shama, which previously considered as a subspecies of the white-rumped shama. The other resident species are also found in the nearby Indian mainland, but over 80 have developed distinct Sri Lankan subspecies. Some of these subspecies are very different in their plumage characteristics from the related forms in India. Of the 35 endemic species, 26 species are globally threatened.

Bird distribution in Sri Lanka is largely determined by its climatic zones. The dry zone is largest of the three, covering more than half of the island, with a prolonged dry and hot period and only one monsoon, the north east monsoon from October to January.

The wet zone, with two monsoons, is in the south western quarter of the island, where the few remaining rain forests are found and humidity is high.

The central hill zone rises to over 2,450 metres (8,040 ft) and has a cool temperate climate. Most of the 35 endemic species are confined to the wet and the hill zones, with only a few extending into the dry zone as well.

Recent updates and sighting information can be obtained through the Field Ornithology Group of Sri Lanka website. The following list is prepared according to An Illustrated Guide to the Birds of Sri Lanka on 2010 by Sarath Kotagama and Gamini Ratnavira, with updates from the Ceylon Bird Club's List of Sri Lankan Birds, which follows the AviList global taxonomy.

The following tags have been used to highlight several categories. The commonly occurring native species do not fall into any of these categories.

- (A) Accidental - a species that rarely or accidentally occurs in Sri Lanka
- (E) Endemic - a species native or restricted to Sri Lanka
- (I) Introduced - a species introduced to Sri Lanka as a consequence, direct or indirect, of human actions

== Ducks, geese, and waterfowl ==
Order: Anseriformes Family: Anatidae

The family Anatidae includes the ducks and most duck-like waterfowl, such as geese and swans. These birds are adapted to an aquatic existence with webbed feet, flattened bills, and feathers that are excellent at shedding water due to an oily coating.

Name	Binomial	Subspecies	Status	IUCN
Fulvous whistling duck	Dendrocygna bicolor			Least concern (A)
Lesser whistling duck	Dendrocygna javanica		Resident	Least concern
Cotton pygmy goose	Nettapus coromandelianus		Resident	Least concern
Bar-headed goose	Anser indicus			Least concern (A)
Greylag goose	Anser anser	Anser anser rubrirostris		Least concern (A)
Ruddy shelduck	Tadorna ferruginea			Least concern (A)
Knob-billed duck	Sarkidiornis melanotos			Least concern (A)
Tufted duck	Aythya fuligula			Least concern (A)
Garganey	Spatula querquedula			Least concern
Northern shoveler	Spatula clypeata			Least concern
Gadwall	Mareca strepera	Mareca strepera strepera		Least concern (A)
Eurasian wigeon	Mareca penelope			Least concern
Indian spot-billed duck	Anas poecilorhyncha	Anas poecilorhyncha poecilorhyncha		Least concern
Northern pintail	Anas acuta			Least concern
Eurasian teal	Anas crecca			Least concern

== Pheasants, grouse, and allies ==
Order: Galliformes Family: Phasianidae

The Phasianidae are a family of terrestrial birds. In general, they are plump and have broad, relatively short wings.

Name	Binomial	Subspecies	Status	IUCN
Indian peafowl	Pavo cristatus		Resident	Least concern
Sri Lanka spurfowl	Galloperdix bicalcarata		Endemic	Least concern
Sri Lanka junglefowl	Gallus lafayettii		Endemic	Least concern
Grey francolin	Ortygornis pondicerianus	Ortygornis pondicerianus pondicerianus		Least concern
Painted francolin	Francolinus pictus			Least concern
King quail	Synoicus chinensis			Least concern
Rain quail	Coturnix coromandelica			Least concern (A)
Jungle bush quail	Perdicula asiatica			Least concern

== Flamingos ==
Order: Phoenicopteriformes Family: Phoenicopteridae

Flamingos are gregarious wading birds, usually 1 to 1.5 metres (3 to 5 ft) tall, found in both the Western and Eastern Hemispheres. Flamingos filter-feed on shellfish and algae. Their oddly shaped beaks are specially adapted to separate mud and silt from the food they consume and, uniquely, are used upside-down.

Name	Binomial	Subspecies	Status	IUCN
Lesser flamingo	Phoeniconaias minor			Near threatened (A)
Greater flamingo	Phoenicopterus roseus			Least concern

== Grebes ==
Order: Podicipediformes Family: Podicipedidae

Grebes are small to medium-sized diving birds. They breed on fresh water, but often visit the sea whilst migrating and in winter. They have lobed toes and are excellent swimmers and divers; however, their feet are placed far back on their bodies, making them quite ungainly on land.

Name	Binomial	Subspecies	Status	IUCN
Little grebe	Tachybaptus ruficollis	Tachybaptus ruficollis albescens	Resident	Least concern

== Cuckoos ==
Order: Cuculiformes Family: Cuculidae

The family Cuculidae includes cuckoos, roadrunners and anis. These birds are of variable size with slender bodies, long tails and strong legs. Many are brood parasites.

Name	Binomial	Subspecies	Status	IUCN
Green-billed coucal	Centropus chlororhynchus		Endemic	Vulnerable
Greater coucal	Centropus sinensis	Centropus sinensis parroti	Resident	Least concern
Sirkeer malkoha	Taccocua leschenaultii			Least concern
Red-faced malkoha	Phaenicophaeus pyrrhocephalus		Endemic	Vulnerable
Blue-faced malkoha	Phaenicophaeus viridirostris			Least concern
Chestnut-winged cuckoo	Clamator coromandus			Least concern
Jacobin cuckoo	Clamator jacobinus	Clamator jacobinus jacobinus		Least concern
Asian koel	Eudynamys scolopacea	Eudynamys scolopacea scolopacea		Least concern
Asian emerald cuckoo	Chrysococcyx maculatus			Least concern (A)
Banded bay cuckoo	Cacomantis sonneratii	Cacomantis sonneratii waiti		Least concern
Grey-bellied cuckoo	Cacomantis passerinus			Least concern
Fork-tailed drongo-cuckoo	Surniculus dicruroides			Least concern
Common hawk-cuckoo	Hierococcyx varius			Least concern
Lesser cuckoo	Cuculus poliocephalus			Least concern
Indian cuckoo	Cuculus micropterus			Least concern
Common cuckoo	Cuculus canorus	Cuculus canorus bakeri		Least concern

== Pigeons and doves ==
Order: Columbiformes Family: Columbidae

Pigeons and doves are stout-bodied birds with short necks and short slender bills with a fleshy cere.

Name	Binomial	Subspecies	Status	IUCN
Spotted dove	Spilopelia chinensis	Spilopelia chinensis ceylonensis	Resident	Least concern
Red collared dove	Streptopelia tranquebarica			Least concern (A)
Oriental turtle dove	Streptopelia orientalis			Least concern
Eurasian collared dove	Streptopelia decaocto			Least concern
Sri Lanka woodpigeon	Columba torringtoniae		Endemic	Vulnerable
Pale-capped pigeon	Columba punicea			Vulnerable (A)
Rock dove	Columba livia	Columba livia intermedia (resident) Columba livia "domestica" (feral pigeon; introduced)	Resident + Introduced	Least concern
Common emerald dove	Chalcophaps indica	Chalcophaps indica robinsoni		Least concern
Orange-breasted green pigeon	Treron bicincta	Treron bicincta leggei		Least concern
Sri Lanka green pigeon	Treron pompadora		Endemic	Least concern
Yellow-footed green pigeon	Treron phoenicoptera			Least concern
Green imperial pigeon	Ducula aenea			Least concern

== Rails, gallinules, and coots ==
Order: Gruiformes Family: Rallidae

Rallidae is a large family of small to medium-sized birds which includes the rails, crakes, coots and moorhens. Typically they inhabit dense vegetation in damp environments near lakes, swamps or rivers. In general they are shy and secretive birds, making them difficult to observe. Most species have strong legs and long toes which are well adapted to soft uneven surfaces. They tend to have short, rounded wings and to be weak fliers.

Name	Binomial	Subspecies	Status	IUCN
Brown-cheeked rail	Rallus indicus			Least concern (A)
Corn crake	Crex crex			Least concern (A)
Slaty-breasted rail	Lewinia striata			Least concern
Common moorhen	Gallinula chloropus	Common moorhen Gallinula chloropus chloropus		Least concern
Eurasian coot	Fulica atra			Least concern
Grey-headed swamphen	Porphyrio poliocephalus			Least concern
Watercock	Gallicrex cinerea			Least concern
White-breasted waterhen	Amaurornis phoenicurus	Amaurornis phoenicurus phoenicurus		Least concern
Slaty-legged crake	Rallina eurizonoides			Least concern
Ruddy-breasted crake	Zapornia fusca			Least concern
Baillon's crake	Zapornia pusilla			Least concern

== Stone-curlews ==
Order: Charadriiformes Family: Burhinidae

Stone-curlews and thick-knees are a group of largely tropical waders in the family Burhinidae. They are found worldwide within the tropical zone, with some species also breeding in temperate Europe and Australia. They are medium to large waders with strong black or yellow-black bills, large yellow eyes and cryptic plumage. Despite being classed as waders, most species have a preference for arid or semi-arid habitats.

Name	Binomial	Subspecies	Status	IUCN
Great stone-curlew	Esacus recurvirostris		Resident	Least concern
Indian stone-curlew	Burhinus indicus		Resident	Least concern

== Stilts and avocets ==
Order: Charadriiformes Family: Recurvirostridae

Recurvirostridae is a family of large wading birds, which includes the avocets and stilts. The avocets have long legs and long up-curved bills. The stilts have extremely long legs and long, thin, straight bills.

Name	Binomial	Subspecies	Status	IUCN
Pied avocet	Recurvirostra avosetta		Resident	Least concern
Black-winged stilt	Himantopus himantopus	Himantopus himantopus meridionalis	Resident	Least concern

== Oystercatchers ==
Order: Charadriiformes Family: Haematopodidae

The oystercatchers are large and noisy plover-like birds, with strong bills used for smashing or prising open molluscs.

Name	Binomial	Subspecies	Status	IUCN
Eurasian oystercatcher	Haematopus ostralegus			Near threatened

== Plovers and lapwings ==
Order: Charadriiformes Family: Charadriidae

The family Charadriidae includes the plovers, dotterels and lapwings. They are small to medium-sized birds with compact bodies, short, thick necks and long, usually pointed, wings. They are found in open country worldwide, mostly in habitats near water.

Name	Binomial	Subspecies	Status	IUCN
Grey plover	Pluvialis squatarola			Least concern
Pacific golden plover	Pluvialis fulva			Least concern
Common ringed plover	Charadrius hiaticula	Charadrius hiaticula tundrae		Least concern
Little ringed plover	Thinornis dubius			Least concern
Yellow-wattled lapwing	Vanellus malabaricus			Least concern
Grey-headed lapwing	Vanellus cinereus			Least concern (A)
Red-wattled lapwing	Vanellus indicus	Vanellus indicus lankae		Least concern
Sociable lapwing	Vanellus gregarius			Critically endangered (A)
Caspian plover	Anarhynchus asiaticus			Least concern (A)
Oriental plover	Anarhynchus veredus			Least concern (A)
Tibetan sand plover	Anarhynchus atrifrons			Least concern
Greater sand plover	Anarhynchus leschenaultii			Least concern
Kentish plover	Charadrius alexandrinus			Least concern

== Painted-snipes ==
Order: Charadriiformes Family: Rostratulidae

Painted-snipes are short-legged, long-billed birds similar in shape to the true snipes, but more brightly coloured.

Name	Binomial	Subspecies	Status	IUCN
Greater painted-snipe	Rostratula benghalensis			Least concern

== Jacanas ==
Order: Charadriiformes Family: Jacanidae

The jacanas are a group of tropical waders in the family Jacanidae. They are found throughout the tropics. They are identifiable by their huge feet and claws which enable them to walk on floating vegetation in the shallow lakes that are their preferred habitat.

Name	Binomial	Subspecies	Status	IUCN
Pheasant-tailed jacana	Hydrophasianus chirurgus			Least concern

== Sandpipers and allies ==
Order: Charadriiformes Family: Scolopacidae

Scolopacidae is a large diverse family of small to medium-sized shorebirds including the sandpipers, curlews, godwits, shanks, tattlers, woodcocks, snipes, dowitchers and phalaropes. The majority of these species eat small invertebrates picked out of the mud or soil. Variation in length of legs and bills enables multiple species to feed in the same habitat, particularly on the coast, without direct competition for food.

Name	Binomial	Subspecies	Status	IUCN
Eurasian whimbrel	Numenius phaeopus			Least Concern
Eurasian curlew	Numenius arquata			Near Threatened
Bar-tailed godwit	Limosa lapponica			Near Threatened
Black-tailed godwit	Limosa limosa			Near Threatened
Asian dowitcher	Limnodramus semipalmatus			Near Threatened (A)
Jack snipe	Lymnocryptes minimus			Least Concern (A)
Eurasian woodcock	Scolopax rusticola			Least Concern
Wood snipe	Gallinago nemoricola			Vulnerable (A)
Great snipe	Gallinago media			Near Threatened (A)
Swinhoe's snipe	Gallinago megala			Least Concern (A)
Pin-tailed snipe	Gallinago stenura			Least Concern
Common snipe	Gallinago gallinago			Least Concern
Terek sandpiper	Xenus cinereus			Least Concern
Common sandpiper	Actitis hypoleucos			Least Concern
Red-necked phalarope	Phalaropus lobatus			Least Concern
Green sandpiper	Tringa ochropus			Least Concern
Marsh sandpiper	Tringa stagnatilis			Least Concern
Wood sandpiper	Tringa glareola			Least Concern
Common redshank	Tringa totanus			Least Concern
Spotted redshank	Tringa erythropus			Least Concern (A)
Common greenshank	Tringa nebularia			Least Concern
Nordmann's greenshank	Tringa guttifer			Endangered (A)
Ruddy turnstone	Arenaria interpres			Least Concern
Red knot	Calidris canutus			Near Threatened
Great knot	Calidris tenuirostris			Endangered
Ruff	Calidris pugnax			Least Concern
Sharp-tailed sandpiper	Calidris acuminata			Least Concern (A)
Broad-billed sandpiper	Calidris falcinellus			Least Concern
Curlew sandpiper	Calidris ferruginea			Near Threatened
Spoon-billed sandpiper	Calidris pygmeus			Critically Endangered (A)
Red-necked stint	Calidris ruficollis			Near Threatened (A)
Temminck's stint	Calidris temminckii			Least Concern
Long-toed stint	Calidris subminuta			Least Concern
Buff-breasted sandpiper	Calidris subruficollis			Near Threatened (A)
Sanderling	Calidris alba			Least Concern
Dunlin	Calidris alpina			Least Concern (A)
Pectoral sandpiper	Calidris melanotos			Least Concern (A)
Little stint	Calidris minuta			Least Concern

== Buttonquail ==
Order: Charadriiformes Family: Turnicidae

The buttonquail are small, drab, running birds which resemble the true quails. The female is the brighter of the sexes and initiates courtship.

Name	Binomial	Subspecies	Status	IUCN
Barred buttonquail	Turnix suscitator			Least concern
Common buttonquail	Turnix sylvaticus			Least concern (A)

== Crab-plover ==
Order: Charadriiformes Family: Dromadidae

The crab-plover is related to the waders. It resembles a plover but with very long grey legs and a strong heavy black bill similar to a tern. It has black-and-white plumage, a long neck, partially webbed feet and a bill designed for eating crabs.

Name	Binomial	Subspecies	Status	IUCN
Crab-plover	Dromas ardeola			Least concern

== Pratincoles and coursers ==
Order: Charadriiformes Family: Glareolidae

Glareolidae is a family of wading birds comprising the pratincoles, which have short legs, long pointed wings and long forked tails, and the coursers, which have long legs, short wings and long, pointed bills which curve downwards.

Name	Binomial	Subspecies	Status	IUCN
Indian courser	Cursorius coromandelicus			Least concern
Small pratincole	Glareola lactea			Least concern
Oriental pratincole	Glareola maldivarum			Least concern
Collared pratincole	Glareola pratincola			Least concern

== Skuas ==
Order: Charadriiformes Family: Stercorariidae

The family Stercorariidae are, in general, medium to large birds, typically with grey or brown plumage, often with white markings on the wings. They nest on the ground in temperate and arctic regions and are long-distance migrants.

Name	Binomial	Subspecies	Status	IUCN
Arctic skua	Stercorarius parasiticus			Least concern (A)
Long-tailed skua	Stercorarius longicaudus			Least concern (A)
Pomarine skua	Stercorarius pomarinus			Least concern
South polar skua	Catharacta maccormicki			Least concern (A)
Brown skua	Catharacta antarctica			Least concern

== Gulls, terns, and skimmers ==
Order: Charadriiformes Family: Laridae

Laridae is a family of medium to large seabirds, the gulls and terns. Gulls are typically grey or white, often with black markings on the head or wings. They have stout, longish bills and webbed feet. Terns are a group of generally medium to large seabirds typically with grey or white plumage, often with black markings on the head. Most terns hunt fish by diving but some pick insects off the surface of fresh water. Terns are generally long-lived birds, with several species known to live in excess of 30 years.

Name	Binomial	Subspecies	Status	IUCN
Brown noddy	Anous stolidus	Anous stolidus pileatus		Least concern
Lesser noddy	Anous tenuirostris	Anous tenuirostris tenuirostris		Least concern
Sooty tern	Onychoprion fuscatus	Onychoprion fuscatus nubilosus		Least concern
Bridled tern	Onychoprion anaethetus	Onychoprion anaethetus antarcticus		Least concern
Little tern	Sternula albifrons	Sternula albifrons sinensis		Least concern
Saunders's tern	Sternula saundersi			Least concern
Caspian tern	Hydroprogne caspia			Least concern
Gull-billed tern	Gelochelidon nilotica	Gelochelidon nilotica nilotica		Least concern
Whiskered tern	Chlidonias hybrida	Chlidonias hybrida hyrbida		Least concern
White-winged tern	Chlidonias leucopterus			Least concern
Black tern	Chlidonias niger			Least concern
Sandwich tern	Thalasseus sandvicensis			Least concern
Great crested tern	Thalasseus bergii	Thalasseus bergii velox		Least concern
Lesser crested tern	Thalasseus bengalensis	Thalasseus bengalensis bengalensis		Least concern
Common tern	Sterna hirundo	Sterna hirundo tibetana		Least concern
Black-naped tern	Sterna sumatrana			Least concern
Roseate tern	Sterna dougalli	Sterna dougalli korustes		Least concern
Slender-billed gull	Chroicocephalus genei			Least concern
Black-headed gull	Chroicocephalus ridibundus			Least concern
Brown-headed gull	Chroicocephalus brunnicephalus			Least concern
Pallas's gull	Ichthyaetus ichthyaetus			Least concern
Sooty gull	Ichthyaetus hemprichii			Least concern
Lesser black-backed gull	Larus fuscus	Larus fuscus heuglini		Least concern

== Tropicbirds ==
Order: Phaethontiformes Family: Phaethontidae

Tropicbirds are slender white birds of tropical oceans, with exceptionally long central tail feathers. Their heads and long wings have black markings.

Name	Binomial	Subspecies	Status	IUCN
Red-billed tropicbird	Phaethon aethereus	Phaethon aethereus indicus		Least concern
White-tailed tropicbird	Phaethon lepturus	Phaethon lepturus lepturus		Least concern

== Southern storm petrels ==
Order: Procellariiformes Family: Oceanitidae

Southern storm petrels are small birds which spend most of their lives at sea, coming ashore only to breed. They feed on planktonic crustaceans and small fish picked from the surface, typically while hovering or pattering across the water. Their flight is fluttering and sometimes bat-like.

Name	Binomial	Subspecies	Status	IUCN
Wilson's storm petrel	Oceanites oceanicus			Least concern
White-faced storm petrel	Pelagodroma marina			Least concern
Black-bellied storm petrel	Fregetta tropica			Least concern (A)

== Northern storm petrels ==
Order: Procellariiformes Family: Hydrobatidae

Northern storm petrels are small birds which spend most of their lives at sea, coming ashore only to breed. They feed on planktonic crustaceans and small fish picked from the surface, typically while hovering or pattering across the water. Their flight is fluttering and sometimes bat-like.

Name	Binomial	Subspecies	Status	IUCN
Swinhoe's storm petrel	Hydrobates monorhis			Near threatened (A)

== Shearwaters and petrels ==
Order: Procellariiformes Family: Procellariidae

The procellariids are the main group of medium-sized shearwaters and petrels, characterised by united nostrils with medium septum and a long outer functional primary.

Name	Binomial	Subspecies	Status	IUCN
Cape petrel	Daption capense	Daption capense capense	Migrant	Least concern (A)
Bulwer's petrel	Bulweria bulwerii			Least concern (A)
Jouanin's petrel	Bulweria fallax			Near threatened (A)
Streaked shearwater	Calonectris leucomelas			Near threatened (A)
Wedge-tailed shearwater	Ardenna pacificus			Least concern
Short-tailed shearwater	Ardenna tenuirostris			Least concern (A)
Sooty shearwater	Ardenna griseus			Near threatened (A)
Flesh-footed shearwater	Ardenna cameipes			Near threatened
Barau's petrel	Pterodroma baraui			Endangered (A)

== Storks ==
Order: Ciconiiformes Family: Ciconiidae

Storks are large, long-legged, long-necked, wading birds with long, stout bills. Storks are virtually mute, but bill-clattering is an important mode of communication at the nest. Their nests can be large and may be reused for many years. Many species are migratory.

Name	Binomial	Subspecies	Status	IUCN
Asian openbill	Anastomus oscitans		Resident	Least concern
Lesser adjutant	Leptoptilos javanicus		Resident	Vulnerable
Painted stork	Mycteria leucocephala		Resident	Near threatened
Black-necked stork	Ephippiorhynchus asiaticus	Ephippiorhynchus asiaticus asiaticus	Resident	Near threatened
Black stork	Ciconia nigra			Least concern (A)
White stork	Ciconia ciconia	Ciconia ciconia asiatica		Least concern (A)
Asian woolly-necked stork	Ciconia episcopus	Ciconia episcopus episcopus	Resident	Vulnerable

== Frigatebirds ==
Order: Suliformes Family: Fregatidae

Frigatebirds are large seabirds usually found over tropical oceans. They are large, black and white or completely black, with long wings and deeply forked tails. The males have coloured inflatable throat pouches. They do not swim or walk and cannot take off from a flat surface. Having the largest wingspan-to-body-weight ratio of any bird, they are essentially aerial, able to stay aloft for more than a week. None are resident.

Name	Binomial	Subspecies	Status	IUCN
Lesser frigatebird	Fregata ariel	Fregata ariel ariel		Least concern (A)
Christmas Island frigatebird	Fregata andrewsi			Critically endangered (A)
Great frigatebird	Fregata minor	Fregata minor minor		Least concern (A)

== Boobies and gannets ==
Order: Suliformes Family: Sulidae

The gannets and boobies in the family Sulidae are medium to large coastal seabirds that plunge-dive for fish.

Name	Binomial	Subspecies	Status	IUCN
Red-footed booby	Sula sula	Sula sula rubripes		Least concern
Brown booby	Sula leucogaster	Sula leucogaster plotus		Least concern
Masked booby	Sula dactylatra	Sula dactylatra melanops		Least concern

== Anhingas ==
Order: Suliformes Family: Anhingidae

Anhingas or darters are often called "snake-birds" because they have long thin necks, which gives a snake-like appearance when they swim with their bodies submerged. The males have black and dark-brown plumage, an erectile crest on the nape, and a larger bill than the female. The females have much paler plumage, especially on the neck and underparts. The darters have completely webbed feet and their legs are short and set far back on the body. Their plumage is somewhat permeable, like that of cormorants, and they spread their wings to dry after diving.

Name	Binomial	Subspecies	Status	IUCN
Oriental darter	Anhinga melanogaster		Resident	Near threatened

== Cormorants and shags ==
Order: Suliformes Family: Phalacrocoracidae

Phalacrocoracidae is a family of medium to large coastal, fish-eating seabirds that includes cormorants and shags. Plumage colour varies; the majority of species have mainly dark plumage, but some are pied black and white, and a few are more colourful.

Name	Binomial	Subspecies	Status	IUCN
Little cormorant	Microcarbo niger		Resident	Least concern
Great cormorant	Phalacrocorax carbo	Phalacrocorax carbo sinensis	Resident	Least concern
Indian cormorant	Phalacrocorax fuscicollis		Resident	Least concern

== Ibises and spoonbills ==
Order: Pelecaniformes Family: Threskiornithidae

Threskiornithidae is a family of large terrestrial and wading birds which comprises the ibises and spoonbills. Its members have long, broad wings with 11 primary and about 20 secondary flight feathers. They are strong fliers and, despite their size and weight, very capable soarers.

Name	Binomial	Subspecies	Status	IUCN
Glossy ibis	Plegadis falcinellus			Least concern
Eurasian spoonbill	Platalea leucorodia	Platalea leucorodia leucorodia	Resident.	Least concern
Black-headed ibis	Threskiornis melanocephalus		Resident.	Near threatened

== Pelicans ==
Order: Pelecaniformes Family: Pelecanidae

Pelicans are large water birds with a distinctive pouch under their beak. As with other members of the order Pelecaniformes, they have webbed feet with four toes.

Name	Binomial	Subspecies	Status	IUCN
Spot-billed pelican	Pelecanus philippensis		Resident.	Near threatened

== Herons, egrets, and bitterns ==
Order: Pelecaniformes Family: Ardeidae

The family Ardeidae contains the bitterns, herons and egrets. Herons and egrets are medium to large wading birds with long necks and legs. Bitterns tend to be shorter necked and more wary. Unlike other long-necked birds such as storks, ibises and spoonbills, members of this family fly with their necks retracted.

Name	Binomial	Subspecies	Status	IUCN
Great bittern	Botaurus stellaris	Botaurus stellaris stellaris		Least concern (A)
Black bittern	Botaurus flavicollis		Resident	Least concern
Cinnamon bittern	Botaurus cinnamomeus		Resident	Least concern
Schrenck's bittern	Botaurus eurhythmus			Least concern (A)
Yellow bittern	Botaurus sinensis		Resident	Least concern
Malayan night heron	Gorsachius melanolophus			Least concern
Western reef heron	Egretta gularis		Resident.	Least concern
Little egret	Egretta garzetta	Egretta garzetta garzetta	Resident	Least concern
Black-crowned night heron	Nycticorax nycticorax	Nycticorax nycticorax nycticorax	Resident	Least concern
Little heron	Butorides atricapilla	Butorides atricapilla javanica	Resident	Least concern
Indian pond heron	Ardeola grayii		Resident	Least concern
Chinese pond heron	Ardeola bacchus			Least concern (A)
Great egret	Ardea alba	Eastern great egret Ardea alba modesta	Resident	Least concern
Intermediate egret	Ardea intermedia		Resident	Least concern
Eastern cattle egret	Ardea coromanda		Resident	Least concern
Purple heron	Ardea purpurea	Ardea purpurea manilensis	Resident	Least concern
Goliath heron	Ardea goliath			Least concern (A)
Grey heron	Ardea cinerea	Ardea cinerea cinerea	Resident	Least concern

== Nightjars and allies ==
Order: Caprimulgiformes Family: Caprimulgidae

Nightjars are medium-sized nocturnal birds that usually nest on the ground. They have long wings, short legs and very short bills. Most have small feet, of little use for walking, and long pointed wings. Their soft plumage is camouflaged to resemble bark or leaves.

Name	Binomial	Subspecies	Status	IUCN
Great eared nightjar	Lyncornis macrotis			Least concern (A)
Jungle nightjar	Caprimulgus indicus	Caprimulgus indicus kelaarti	Resident	Least concern
Jerdon's nightjar	Caprimulgus atripennis	Caprimulgus atripennis aequabilis	Resident	Least concern
Indian nightjar	Caprimulgus asiaticus		Resident	Least concern

== Frogmouths ==
Order: Podargiformes Family: Podargidae

The frogmouths are a group of nocturnal birds related to the nightjars. They are named for their large flattened hooked bill and huge frog-like gape, which they use to take insects.

Name	Binomial	Subspecies	Status	IUCN
Sri Lanka frogmouth	Batrachostomus moniliger		Resident	Least concern

== Treeswifts ==
Order: Apodiformes Family: Hemiprocnidae

The treeswifts, or crested swifts, are closely related to the true swifts. They differ from the other swifts in that they have crests, long forked tails and softer plumage.

Name	Binomial	Subspecies	Status	IUCN
Crested treeswift	Hemiprocne coronata		Resident	Least concern

== Swifts ==
Order: Apodiformes Family: Apodidae

Swifts are small birds which spend the majority of their lives flying. These birds have very short legs and never settle voluntarily on the ground, perching instead only on vertical surfaces. Many swifts have long swept-back wings which resemble a crescent or boomerang.

Name	Binomial	Subspecies	Status	IUCN
Brown-backed needletail	Hirundapus giganteus			Least concern
Asian palm swift	Cypsiurus balasiensis			Least concern
Alpine swift	Tachymarptis melba			Least concern
Pacific swift (fork-tailed swift)	Apus pacificus			Least concern (A)
Little swift	Apus affinis			Least concern
Indian swiftlet	Aerodramus unicolor			Least concern

== Barn owls ==
Order: Strigiformes Family: Tytonidae

Barn owls are medium to large owls with large heads and characteristic heart-shaped faces. They have long strong legs with powerful talons.

Name	Binomial	Subspecies	Status	IUCN
Sri Lanka bay owl	Phodilus assimilis	Phodilus assimilis assimilis	Resident	Least concern
Eastern barn owl	Tyto javanica	Tyto javanica stertens	Resident	Least concern

== Owls ==
Order: Strigiformes Family: Strigidae

The typical owls are small to large solitary nocturnal birds of prey. They have large forward-facing eyes and ears, a hawk-like beak and a conspicuous circle of feathers around each eye called a facial disk.

Name	Binomial	Subspecies	Status	IUCN
Brown boobook	Ninox scutulata		Resident	Least concern
Jungle owlet	Glaucidium radiatum		Resident	Least concern
Chestnut-backed owlet	Glaucidium castanotum		Endemic	Least concern
Serendib scops owl	Otus thilohoffmanni		Endemic	Endangered
Indian scops owl	Otus bakkamoena		Resident	Least concern
Oriental scops owl	Otus sunia		Resident	Least concern
Short-eared owl	Asio flammeus	Asio flammeus flammeus	Vagrant	Least concern
Brown fish owl	Ketupa zeylonensis	Sri Lankan brown fish owl Ketupa zeylonensis zeylonensis	Resident	Least concern
Spot-bellied eagle-owl	Bubo nipalensis		Resident	Least concern
Brown wood owl	Strix leptogrammica		Resident	Least concern

== Osprey ==
Order: Accipitriformes Family: Pandionidae

The family Pandionidae contains only one species, the osprey. The osprey is a medium-large raptor which is a specialist fish-eater with a worldwide distribution.

Name	Binomial	Subspecies	Status	IUCN
Osprey	Pandion haliaetus		Resident	Least concern

== Hawks, eagles, and kites ==
Order: Accipitriformes Family: Accipitridae

Accipitridae is a family of birds of prey, which includes hawks, eagles, kites, harriers and Old World vultures. These birds have powerful hooked beaks for tearing flesh from their prey, strong legs, powerful talons and keen eyesight.

Name	Binomial	Subspecies	Status	IUCN
Black-winged kite	Elanus caeruleus	Elanus caeruleus vociferus		Least concern
Egyptian vulture	Neophron percnopterus	Neophron percnopterus ginginiatus		Endangered (A)
Jerdon's baza	Aviceda jerdoni	Aviceda jerdoni ceylonensis		Least concern
Black baza	Aviceda leuphotes			Least concern
European honey buzzard	Pernis apivorus			Least concern (A)
Crested honey buzzard	Pernis ptilorhynchus			Least concern
Crested serpent eagle	Spilornis cheela	Spilornis cheela spilogaster		Least concern
Legge's hawk-eagle	Nisaetus kelaarti			Not evaluated
Changeable hawk-eagle	Nisaetus cirrhatus	Nisaetus cirrhatus ceylanensis		Least concern
Rufous-bellied eagle	Lophotriorchis kieneri			Least concern
Black eagle	Ictinaetus malaiensis			Least concern
Greater spotted eagle	Clanga clanga			Vulnerable (A)
Booted eagle	Hieraaetus pennatus			Least concern
Bonelli's eagle	Aquila fasciata			Least concern (A)
Crested goshawk	Lophospiza trivirgata			Least concern
Besra	Tachyspiza virgatus			Least concern
Shikra	Tachyspiza badius			Least concern
Eurasian sparrowhawk	Accipiter nisus			Least concern (A)
Pallid harrier	Circus macrourus			Near threatened
Montagu's harrier	Circus pygargus			Least concern
Pied harrier	Circus melanoleucos			Least concern (A)
Western marsh harrier	Circus aeruginosus			Least concern
Brahminy kite	Haliastur indus	Haliastur indus indus		Least concern
Black kite	Milvus migrans	Milvus migrans govinda		Least concern
White-bellied sea eagle	Ichthyophaga leucogaster			Least concern
Grey-headed fish eagle	Ichthyophaga ichthyaetus			Least concern
Common buzzard	Buteo buteo	Buteo buteo vulpinus		Least concern
Long-legged buzzard	Buteo rufinus	Buteo rufinus rufinus		Least concern (A)

== Trogons ==
Order: Trogoniformes Family: Trogonidae

The family Trogonidae includes trogons and quetzals. Found in tropical woodlands worldwide, they feed on insects and fruit, and their broad bills and weak legs reflect their diet and arboreal habits. Although their flight is fast, they are reluctant to fly any distance. Trogons have soft, often colourful, feathers, with distinctive male and female plumage.

Name	Binomial	Subspecies	Status	IUCN
Malabar trogon	Harpactes fasciatus		Resident	Least concern

== Hoopoes ==
Order: Bucerotiformes Family: Upupidae

Hoopoes have black, white and orangey-pink colouring with a large erectile crest on their head.

Name	Binomial	Subspecies	Status	IUCN
Eurasian hoopoe	Upupa epops	Upupa epops ceylonensis	Resident	Least concern

== Hornbills ==
Order: Bucerotiformes Family: Bucerotidae

Hornbills are a group of birds whose bill is shaped like a cow's horn, but without a twist, sometimes with a casque on the upper mandible. Frequently, the bill is brightly coloured.

Name	Binomial	Subspecies	Status	IUCN
Sri Lanka grey hornbill	Ocyceros gingalensis		Endemic	Least concern
Malabar pied hornbill	Anthracoceros coronatus		Resident	Least concern

== Rollers ==
Order: Coraciiformes Family: Coraciidae

Rollers resemble crows in size and build, but are more closely related to the kingfishers and bee-eaters. They share the colourful appearance of those groups with blues and browns predominating. The two inner front toes are connected, but the outer toe is not.

Name	Binomial	Subspecies	Status	IUCN
Dollarbird	Eurystomus orientalis	Eurystomus orientalis irisi	Resident	Least concern
Indian roller	Coracias benghalensis	Coracias benghalensis indicus	Resident	Least concern
European roller	Coracias garrulus			Least concern (A)

== Bee-eaters ==
Order: Coraciiformes Family: Meropidae

The bee-eaters are a group of coraciiform birds in the family Meropidae. Most species are found in Africa but others occur in southern Europe, Madagascar, Australia and New Guinea. They are characterised by richly coloured plumage, slender bodies and usually elongated central tail feathers. All are colourful and have long downturned bills and pointed wings, which give them a swallow-like appearance when seen from afar.

Name	Binomial	Subspecies	Status	IUCN
Chestnut-headed bee-eater	Merops leschenaulti		Resident	Least concern
Asian green bee-eater	Merops orientalis	• Merops orientalis orientalis • Merops orientalis ceylonicus	Resident	Least concern
European bee-eater	Merops apiaster		Vagrant	Least concern
Blue-tailed bee-eater	Merops philippinus		Resident	Least concern

== Kingfishers ==
Order: Coraciiformes Family: Alcedinidae

Kingfishers are medium-sized birds with large heads, long, pointed bills, short legs and stubby tails.

Name	Binomial	Subspecies	Status	IUCN
Blue-eared kingfisher	Alcedo meninting	Alcedo meninting phillipsi	Resident	Least concern
Common kingfisher	Alcedo atthis	Alcedo atthis taprobana	Resident	Least concern
Black-backed dwarf kingfisher	Ceyx erithaca		Resident	Least concern
Pied kingfisher	Ceryle rudis	Ceryle rudis leucomelanurus	Resident	Least concern
Stork-billed kingfisher	Pelargopsis capensis	Pelargopsis capensis capensis	Resident	Least concern
Black-capped kingfisher	Halcyon pileata		Resident	Least concern
White-throated kingfisher	Halcyon smyrnensis	Halcyon smyrnensis fusca	Resident	Least concern

== Asian barbets ==
Order: Piciformes Family: Megalaimidae

The Asian barbets are plump birds, with short necks and large heads. They get their name from the bristles which fringe their heavy bills. Most species are brightly coloured.

Name	Binomial	Subspecies	Status	IUCN
Crimson-fronted barbet	Psilopogon rubricapillus		Endemic	Least concern
Coppersmith barbet	Psilopogon haemacephalus	Psilopogon haemacephalus indica	Resident	Least concern
Brown-headed barbet	Psilopogon zeylanicus		Resident	Least concern
Yellow-fronted barbet	Psilopogon flavilfrons		Endemic	Least concern

== Woodpeckers ==
Order: Piciformes Family: Picidae

Woodpeckers are small to medium-sized birds with chisel-like beaks, short legs, stiff tails and long tongues used for capturing insects. Some species have feet with two toes pointing forward and two backward, while several species have only three toes. Many woodpeckers have the habit of tapping noisily on tree trunks with their beaks.

Name	Binomial	Subspecies	Status	IUCN
Eurasian Wryneck	Jynx torquilla			Least concern (A)
Rufous woodpecker	Micropternus brachyurus			Least concern
Black-rumped flameback	Dinopium benghalense • Dinopium benghalense jaffnense		Resident	Least concern
Red-backed flameback	Dinopium psarodes		Endemic	Least concern
Lesser yellownape	Picus chlorolophus	Picus chlorolophus wellsi		Least concern
Streak-throated woodpecker	Picus xanthopygaeus			Least concern
Crimson-backed flameback	Chrysocolaptes stricklandi		Endemic.	Least concern
White-naped woodpecker	Chrysocolaptes festivus			Least concern
Brown-capped pygmy woodpecker	Yungipicus nanus			Least concern
Yellow-crowned woodpecker	Leiopicus mahrattensis			Least concern

== Falcons ==
Order: Falconiformes Family: Falconidae

Falconidae is a family of diurnal birds of prey. They differ from hawks, eagles and kites in that they kill with their beaks instead of their talons.

Name	Binomial	Subspecies	Status	IUCN
Lesser kestrel	Falco naumanni			Least concern (A)
Common kestrel	Falco tinnunculus	Falco tinnunculus tinnunculus	Resident	Least concern
Amur falcon	Falco amurensis			Least concern (A)
Oriental hobby	Falco severus			Least concern (A)
Eurasian hobby	Falco subbuteo			Least concern (A)
Red-necked falcon	Falco chicquera			Near threatened (A)
Peregrine falcon	Falco peregrinus	• Shaheen falcon Falco peregrinus peregrinator • Eastern peregrine falcon Falco peregrinus calidus		Least concern

== Old World parrots ==
Order: Psittaciformes Family: Psittaculidae

Characteristic features of parrots include a strong curved bill, strong legs, and clawed zygodactyl feet. Many parrots are vividly coloured, and some are multi-coloured. In size they range from 8 cm (3.1 in) to 1 m (3.3 ft) in length. Old World parrots are found from Africa east across south and southeast Asia and Oceania to Australia and New Zealand.

Name	Binomial	Subspecies	Status	IUCN
Alexandrine parakeet	Psittacula eupatria	Psittacula eupatria eupatria	Resident	Near threatened
Rose-ringed parakeet	Psittacula krameri	Psittacula krameri manillensis	Resident	Least concern
Plum-headed parakeet	Psittacula cyanocephala	Psittacula cyanocephala cyanocephala	Resident	Least concern
Layard's parakeet	Psittacula calthrapae		Endemic	Least concern
Sri Lanka hanging parrot	Loriculus beryllinus		Endemic	Least concern

== Pittas ==
Order: Passeriformes Family: Pittidae

Pittas are medium-sized by passerine standards and are stocky, with fairly long, strong legs, short tails and stout bills. Many are brightly coloured. They spend the majority of their time on wet forest floors, eating snails, insects and similar invertebrates.

Name	Binomial	Subspecies	Status	IUCN
Indian pitta	Pitta brachyura		Migrant	Least concern

== Cuckooshrikes ==
Order: Passeriformes Family: Campephagidae

The cuckooshrikes are small to medium-sized passerine birds. They are predominantly greyish with white and black, although some species are brightly coloured.

Name	Binomial	Subspecies	Status	IUCN
Small minivet	Pericrocotus cinnamomeus	Pericrocotus cinnamomeus malabaricus		Least concern
Scarlet minivet (orange minivet)	Pericrocotus flammeus			Least concern
Indian cuckooshrike	Coracina macei			Least concern
Black-headed cuckooshrike	Lalage melanoptera			Least concern

== Woodswallows and allies ==
Order: Passeriformes Family: Artamidae

The woodswallows are soft-plumaged, sombre-coloured passerine birds. They are smooth, agile flyers with moderately large, semi-triangular wings.

Name	Binomial	Subspecies	Status	IUCN
Ashy woodswallow	Artamus fuscus		Resident	Least concern

== Ioras ==
Order: Passeriformes Family: Aegithinidae

The ioras are bulbul-like birds of open forest or thorn scrub, but whereas that group tends to be drab in colouration, ioras are sexually dimorphic, with the males being brightly plumaged in yellows and greens.

Name	Binomial	Subspecies	Status	IUCN
Common iora	Aegithina tiphia		Resident	Least concern
Marshall's iora	Aegithina nigrolutea			Least concern

== Vangas, helmetshrikes, and allies ==
Order: Passeriformes Family: Vangidae

The Vangidae comprises a group of medium-sized, often shrike-like, birds distributed from Asia to Africa. Many species in this family were previously classified elsewhere in other families.

Name	Binomial	Subspecies	Status	IUCN
Bar-winged flycatcher-shrike	Hemipus picatus	Hemipus picatus leggei	Resident	Least concern
Sri Lanka woodshrike	Tephrodornis affinis		Endemic	Least concern

== Old World orioles ==
Order: Passeriformes Family: Oriolidae

The Old World orioles are colourful passerine birds. They are not related to the New World orioles.

Name	Binomial	Subspecies	Status	IUCN
Black-hooded oriole	Oriolus xanthornus	Oriolus xanthornus ceylonensis	Resident	Least concern
Indian golden oriole	Oriolus kundoo			Least concern
Eurasian golden oriole	Oriolus oriolus			Least concern (A)
Black-naped oriole	Oriolus chinensis	Oriolus chinensis diffusus		Least concern (A)

== Fantails ==
Order: Passeriformes Family: Rhipiduridae

The fantails are small insectivorous birds which are specialist aerial feeders.

Name	Binomial	Subspecies	Status	IUCN
White-browed fantail	Rhipidura aureola			Least concern

== Drongos ==
Order: Passeriformes Family: Dicruridae

The drongos are mostly black or dark grey in colour, sometimes with metallic iridescence. They have long forked tails, and some Asian species have elaborate tail decorations. They have short legs and sit very upright when perched, like a shrike. They flycatch or take prey from the ground.

Name	Binomial	Subspecies	Status	IUCN
Sri Lanka drongo	Dicrurus lophorinus		Endemic	Least concern
Greater racket-tailed drongo	Dicrurus paradiseus	Dicrurus paradiseus ceylonicus		Least concern
White-bellied drongo	Dicrurus caerulescens	Dicrurus caerulescens leucopygialis		Least concern
Ashy drongo	Dicrurus leucophaeus			Least concern
Black drongo	Dicrurus macrocercus			Least concern

== Monarch flycatchers ==
Order: Passeriformes Family: Monarchidae

The monarch flycatchers are small to medium-sized insectivorous passerines which hunt by flycatching.

Name	Binomial	Subspecies	Status	IUCN
Black-naped monarch	Hypothymis azurea	Hypothymis azurea ceylonensis		Least concern
Indian paradise flycatcher	Terpsiphone paradisi	• Ceylon paradise flycatcher Terpsiphone paradisi ceylonensis • Indian paradise flycatcher Terpsiphone paradisi paradisi • Himalayan paradise flycatcher Terpsiphone paradisi leucogaster	Resident, Migrant	Least concern

== Shrikes ==
Order: Passeriformes Family: Laniidae

Shrikes are passerine birds known for their habit of catching other birds and small animals and impaling the uneaten portions of their bodies on thorns. A typical shrike's beak is hooked, like a bird of prey.

Name	Binomial	Subspecies	Status	IUCN
Great grey shrike	Lanius excubitor			Least concern (A)
Bay-backed shrike	Lanius vittatus			Least concern (A)
Long-tailed shrike	Lanius schach	Lanius schach caniceps		Least concern
Brown shrike	Lanius cristatus	Lanius cristatus cristatus		Least concern

== Crows, jays, and magpies ==
Order: Passeriformes Family: Corvidae

The family Corvidae includes crows, ravens, jays, choughs, magpies, treepies, nutcrackers and ground jays. Corvids are above average in size among the Passeriformes, and some of the larger species show high levels of intelligence.

Name	Binomial	Subspecies	Status	IUCN
Sri Lanka blue magpie	Urocissa ornata		Endemic	Vulnerable
House crow	Corvus splendens	Corvus splendens protegatus	Resident	Least concern
Indian jungle crow	Corvus culminatus		Resident	Least concern

== Fairy flycatchers ==
Order: Passeriformes Family: Stenostiridae

Most of the species of this small family are found in Africa, though a few inhabit tropical Asia. They are not closely related to other birds called "flycatchers".

Name	Binomial	Subspecies	Status	IUCN
Grey-headed canary-flycatcher	Culicicapa ceylonensis	Culicicapa ceylonensis ceylonensis		Least concern

== Tits, chickadees, and titmice ==
Order: Passeriformes Family: Paridae

The Paridae are mainly small stocky woodland species with short stout bills. Some have crests. They are adaptable birds, with a mixed diet including seeds and insects.

Name	Binomial	Subspecies	Status	IUCN
Cinereous tit	Parus cinereus	Parus cinereus mahrattarum	Resident	Least concern

== Larks ==
Order: Passeriformes Family: Alaudidae

Larks are small terrestrial birds with often extravagant songs and display flights. Most larks are fairly dull in appearance. Their food is insects and seeds.

Name	Binomial	Subspecies	Status	IUCN
Ashy-crowned sparrow-lark	Eremopterix griseus	Eremopterix griseus ceylonensis		Least concern
Jerdon's bushlark	Plocealauda affinis			Least concern
Oriental skylark	Alauda gulgula	Alauda gulgula gulgula		Least concern
Mongolian short-toed lark	Calandrella dukhunensis			Least concern (A)

== Cisticolas and allies ==
Order: Passeriformes Family: Cisticolidae

The Cisticolidae are warblers found mainly in warmer southern regions of the Old World. They are generally very small birds of drab brown or grey appearance found in open country such as grassland or scrub.

Name	Binomial	Subspecies	Status	IUCN
Common tailorbird	Orthotomus sutorius	• Highland common tailorbird Orthotomus sutorius fernandonis • Lowland common tailorbird Orthotomus sutorius sutorius	Resident	Least concern
Grey-breasted prinia	Prinia hodgsonii	Prinia hodgsonii pectoralis		Least concern
Jungle prinia	Prinia sylvatica			Least concern
Ashy prinia	Prinia socialis	Prinia socialis brevicauda		Least concern
Plain prinia	Prinia inornata			Least concern
Zitting cisticola	Cisticola juncidis	Cisticola juncidis cursitans		Least concern

== Reed warblers and allies ==
Order: Passeriformes Family: Acrocephalidae

The members of this family are medium-sized to large warblers. Most are rather plain olivaceous brown above with much yellow to beige below. They are usually found in open woodland, reedbeds, or tall grass. The family occurs mostly in southern to western Eurasia and surroundings, but it also ranges far into the Pacific, with some species in Africa.

Name	Binomial	Subspecies	Status	IUCN
Booted warbler	Iduna caligata			Least concern (A)
Sykes's warbler	Iduna rama			Least concern (A)
Black-browed reed warbler	Acrocephalus bistrigiceps			Least concern (A)
Blyth's reed warbler	Acrocephalus dumetorum		Resident	Least concern
Clamorous reed warbler	Acrocephalus stentoreus	Acrocephalus stentoreus meridionalis		Least concern

== Grassbirds and allies ==
Order: Passeriformes Family: Locustellidae

Locustellidae are a family of small insectivorous songbirds found mainly in Eurasia, Africa, and the Australian region. They are smallish birds with tails that are usually long and pointed, and tend to be drab brownish or buffy all over.

Name	Binomial	Subspecies	Status	IUCN
Pallas's grasshopper warbler	Helopsaltes certhiola			Least concern
Lanceolated warbler	Locustella lanceolata			Least concern (A)
Common grasshopper warbler	Locustella naevia			Least concern (A)
Broad-tailed grassbird	Schoenicola platyurus			Vulnerable (A)
Sri Lanka bush warbler	Elaphrornis palliseri		Endemic	Near threatened

== Swallows ==
Order: Passeriformes Family: Hirundinidae

The family Hirundinidae is adapted to aerial feeding. They have a slender streamlined body, long pointed wings and a short bill with a wide gape. The feet are adapted to perching rather than walking, and the front toes are partially joined at the base.

Name	Binomial	Subspecies	Status	IUCN
Sand martin	Riparia riparia			Least concern
Dusky crag martin	Ptyonoprogne concolor			Least concern (A)
Hill swallow	Hirundo domicola			Least concern
Wire-tailed swallow	Hirundo smithii	Hirundo smithii filifera		Least concern (A)
Barn swallow	Hirundo rustica	Hirundo rustica rustica		Least concern
Western house martin	Delichon urbicum			Least concern (A)
Sri Lanka swallow	Cecropis hyperythra		Endemic	Least concern
Eastern red-rumped swallow	Cecropis daurica			Least concern
Streak-throated swallow	Petrochelidon fluvicola			Least concern (A)

== Leaf warblers ==
Order: Passeriformes Family: Phylloscopidae

Leaf warblers are a family of small insectivorous birds found mostly in Eurasia and ranging into Wallacea and Africa. The species are of various sizes, often green-plumaged above and yellow below, or more subdued with greyish-green to greyish-brown colours.

Name	Binomial	Subspecies	Status	IUCN
Dusky warbler	Phylloscopus fuscatus			Least concern (A)
Green warbler	Phylloscopus nitidus			Least concern
Greenish warbler	Phylloscopus trochiloides			Least concern (A)
Large-billed leaf warbler	Phylloscopus magnirostris			Least concern
Western crowned warbler	Phylloscopus occipitalis			Least concern (A)

== Bulbuls ==
Order: Passeriformes Family: Pycnonotidae

Bulbuls are medium-sized songbirds. Some are colourful with yellow, red or orange vents, cheeks, throats or supercilia, but most are drab, with uniform olive-brown to black plumage. Some species have distinct crests.

Name	Binomial	Subspecies	Status	IUCN
Black-capped bulbul	Rubigula melanicterus		Endemic	Least concern
White-browed bulbul	Pycnonotus luteolus	Pycnonotus luteolus insulae		Least concern
Yellow-eared bulbul	Pycnonotus penicillatus		Endemic	Near threatened
Red-vented bulbul	Pycnonotus cafer	Pycnonotus cafer haemorrhousus	Resident	Least concern
Yellow-browed bulbul	Acritillas indica	Acritillas indica guglielmi		Least concern
Square-tailed bulbul	Hypsipetes ganeesa	Sri Lanka black bulbul Hypsipetes ganeesa humii		Least concern

== Sylviid warblers and allies ==
Order: Passeriformes Family: Sylviidae

The family Sylviidae is a group of small insectivorous passerine birds. They occur as breeding species in Europe, Asia, and Africa. Many species are difficult to identify by appearance, but many have distinctive songs.

Name	Binomial	Subspecies	Status	IUCN
Lesser whitethroat	Curruca curruca	Curruca curruca blythi	Resident	Least concern

== Parrotbills and allies ==
Order: Passeriformes Family: Paradoxornithidae

The family Paradoxornithidae is a group of small insectivorous and seed-eating passerine birds. They mainly occur as breeding species in eastern Asia with a few atypical species in southern Asia and one species in western North America.

Name	Binomial	Subspecies	Status	IUCN
Yellow-eyed babbler	Chrysomma sinense		Resident	Least concern

== White-eyes, yuhinas, and allies ==
Order: Passeriformes Family: Zosteropidae

The white-eyes are small and mostly undistinguished, their plumage above being generally some dull colour like greenish-olive, but some species have a white or bright yellow throat, breast or lower parts, and several have buff flanks. As their name suggests, many species have a white ring around each eye.

Name	Binomial	Subspecies	Status	IUCN
Sri Lanka white-eye	Zosterops ceylonensis		Endemic	Least concern
Indian white-eye	Zosterops palpebrosa		Resident	Least concern

== Tree-babblers, scimitar-babblers, and allies ==
Order: Passeriformes Family: Timaliidae

The babblers, or timaliids, are somewhat diverse in size and colouration, but are characterised by soft fluffy plumage.

Name	Binomial	Subspecies	Status	IUCN
Tawny-bellied babbler	Dumetia hyperythra	Dumetia hyperythra phillipsi		Least concern
Dark-fronted babbler	Dumetia atriceps	• Dryzone dark-fronted babbler Rhopocichla atriceps siccata • Wetzone dark-fronted babbler Rhopocichla atriceps nigrifrons		Least concern
Sri Lanka scimitar babbler	Pomatorhinus melanurus		Endemic	Least concern

== Ground babblers and allies ==
Order: Passeriformes Family: Pellorneidae

These small to medium-sized songbirds have soft fluffy plumage but are otherwise rather diverse. Members of the genus Illadopsis are found in forests, but some other genera are birds of scrublands.

Name	Binomial	Subspecies	Status	IUCN
Brown-capped babbler	Pellorneum fuscocapillum		Endemic	Least concern

== Laughingthrushes and allies ==
Order: Passeriformes Family: Leiothrichidae

The members of this family are diverse in size and colouration, though those of genus Argya tend to be brown or greyish. The family is found in Africa, India, and southeast Asia.

Name	Binomial	Subspecies	Status	IUCN
Orange-billed babbler	Argya rufescens		Endemic	Near threatened
Yellow-billed babbler	Argya affinis	Argya affinis taprobanus	Resident	Least concern
Ashy-headed laughingthrush	Argya cinereifrons		Endemic	Vulnerable

== Nuthatches ==
Order: Passeriformes Family: Sittidae

Nuthatches are small woodland birds. They have the unusual ability to climb down trees head first, unlike other birds which can only go upwards. Nuthatches have big heads, short tails and powerful bills and feet.

Name	Binomial	Subspecies	Status	IUCN
Velvet-fronted nuthatch	Sitta frontalis		Resident	Least concern

== Starlings ==
Order: Passeriformes Family: Sturnidae

Starlings are small to medium-sized passerine birds. Their flight is strong and direct and they are very gregarious. Their preferred habitat is fairly open country. They eat insects and fruit. Plumage is typically dark with a metallic sheen.

Name	Binomial	Subspecies	Status	IUCN
Sri Lanka myna	Gracula ptilogenys		Endemic	Near threatened
Southern hill myna	Gracula indica		Resident	Least concern
Common starling	Sturnus vulgaris			Least concern (A)
Rosy starling	Pastor roseus			Least concern
Daurian starling	Agropsar sturninus			Least concern (A)
Indian pied starling	Gracupica contra			Least concern (A)
White-faced starling	Sturnornis albofrontatus		Endemic	Vulnerable
Brahminy starling	Sturnia pagodarum			Least concern
Chestnut-tailed starling	Sturnia malabarica	Sturnia malabarica malabarica		Least concern (A)
Common myna	Acridotheres tristis	• Acridotheres tristis tristis • Acridotheres tristis melanosternus	Resident	Least concern

== Thrushes and allies ==
Order: Passeriformes Family: Turdidae

The thrushes are a group of passerine birds that occur mainly in the Old World. They are plump, soft plumaged, small to medium-sized insectivores or sometimes omnivores, often feeding on the ground. Many have attractive songs.

Name	Binomial	Subspecies	Status	IUCN
Sri Lanka thrush	Zoothera imbricata		Endemic	Near threatened
Pied thrush	Geokichla wardii			Least concern
Spot-winged thrush	Geokichla spiloptera		Endemic	Near threatened
Orange-headed thrush	Geokichla citrina	Geokichla citrina citrina		Least concern
Indian blackbird	Turdus simillimus	Turdus simillimus kinnisii	Resident	Least concern
Eyebrowed thrush	Turdus obscurus			Least concern (A)

== Old World flycatchers ==
Order: Passeriformes Family: Muscicapidae

Old World flycatchers are a large group of small passerine birds native to the Old World. They are mainly small arboreal insectivores. The appearance of these birds is highly varied, but they mostly have weak songs and harsh calls.

Name	Binomial	Subspecies	Status	IUCN
Asian brown flycatcher	Muscicapa dauurica			Least concern
Brown-breasted flycatcher	Muscicapa muttui			Least concern
Spotted flycatcher	Muscicapa striata			Least concern (A)
Rufous-tailed scrub robin	Cercotrichas galactotes			Least concern (A)
Indian robin	Copsychus fulicatus	Copsychus fulicatus leucopterus	Resident	Least concern
Oriental magpie-robin	Copsychus saularis	Copsychus saularis ceylonensis	Resident	Least concern
Sri Lanka shama	Copsychus leggei		Endemic	Least concern
White-bellied blue flycatcher	Cyornis pallipes			Least concern (A)
Blue-throated flycatcher	Cyomis rubeculoides			Least concern
Hill blue flycatcher	Cyornis whitei			Least concern (A)
Tickell's blue flycatcher	Cyornis tickelliae			Least concern
Blue-and-white flycatcher	Cyanoptila cyanomelana			Least concern (A)
Dull-blue flycatcher	Eumyias sordidus		Endemic	Near threatened
Indian blue robin	Larvivora brunnea		Migrant	Least concern
Bluethroat	Luscinia svecica			Least concern (A)
Sri Lanka whistling thrush	Myophonus blighi		Endemic	Endangered
Yellow-rumped flycatcher	Ficedula zanthopygia			Least concern (A)
Black-and-orange flycatcher	Ficedula nigrorufa			Near threatened (A)
Slaty-blue flycatcher	Ficedula tricolor			Least concern (A)
Kashmir flycatcher	Ficedula subrubra			Vulnerable
Red-breasted flycatcher	Ficedula parva			Least concern (A)
Common rock thrush	Monticola saxatilis			Least concern (A)
Blue rock thrush	Monticola solitarius			Least concern
Whinchat	Saxicola rubetra			Least concern (A)
Siberian stonechat	Saxicola maurus			Not evaluated (A)
Pied bushchat	Saxicola caprata	Saxicola caprata atratus		Least concern
Northern wheatear	Oenanthe oenanthe			Least concern (A)
Isabelline wheatear	Oenanthe isabellina			Least concern (A)
Desert wheatear	Oenanthe deserti			Least concern (A)
Pied wheatear	Oenanthe pleschanka			Least concern (A)

== Flowerpeckers ==
Order: Passeriformes Family: Dicaeidae

The flowerpeckers are very small, stout, often brightly coloured birds, with short tails, short thick curved bills and tubular tongues.

Name	Binomial	Subspecies	Status	IUCN
Thick-billed flowerpecker	Dicaeum agile	Dicaeum agile zeylonense	Resident	Least concern
White-throated flowerpecker	Dicaeum vincens		Endemic	Near threatened
Pale-billed flowerpecker	Dicaeum erythrorhynchos	Dicaeum erythrorhynchos ceylonense	Resident	Least concern

== Sunbirds and spiderhunters ==
Order: Passeriformes Family: Nectariniidae

The sunbirds and spiderhunters are very small passerine birds which feed largely on nectar, although they will also take insects, especially when feeding young. Flight is fast and direct on their short wings. Most species can take nectar by hovering like a hummingbird, but usually perch to feed.

Name	Binomial	Subspecies	Status	IUCN
Purple-rumped sunbird	Leptocoma zeylonica	Leptocoma zeylonica zeylonica	Resident	Least concern
Crimson-backed sunbird	Leptocoma minima			Least concern (A)
Purple sunbird	Cinnyris asiaticus	Cinnyris asiaticus asiaticus	Resident	Least concern
Loten's sunbird	Cinnyris lotenius		Resident	Least concern

== Fairy-bluebirds ==
Order: Passeriformes Family: Irenidae

The fairy-bluebirds are bulbul-like birds of open forest or thorn scrub. The males are dark-blue and the females a duller green.

Name	Binomial	Subspecies	Status	IUCN
Asian fairy-bluebird	Irena puella			Least concern (A)

== Leafbirds ==
Order: Passeriformes Family: Chloropseidae

The leafbirds are small, bulbul-like birds. The males are brightly plumaged, usually in greens and yellows.

Name	Binomial	Subspecies	Status	IUCN
Jerdon's leafbird	Chloropsis jerdoni		Resident	Least concern
Golden-fronted leafbird	Chloropsis aurifrons		Resident	Least concern

== Weavers and allies ==
Order: Passeriformes Family: Ploceidae

The weavers are small passerine birds related to the finches. They are seed-eating birds with rounded conical bills. The males of many species are brightly coloured, usually in red or yellow and black, some species show variation in colour only in the breeding season.

Name	Binomial	Subspecies	Status	IUCN
Streaked weaver	Ploceus manyar			Least concern
Baya weaver	Ploceus philippinus			Least concern

== Waxbills and allies ==
Order: Passeriformes Family: Estrildidae

The estrildid finches are small passerine birds of the Old World tropics and Australasia. They are gregarious and often colonial seed eaters with short thick but pointed bills. They are all similar in structure and habits, but have wide variation in plumage colours and patterns.

Name	Binomial	Subspecies	Status	IUCN
Red avadavat	Amandava amandava			Least concern (A)
Indian silverbill	Euodice malabarica			Least concern
White-rumped munia	Lonchura striata	Southwestern white-rumped munia Lonchura striata striata		Least concern
Black-throated munia	Lonchura kelaarti	Lonchura kelaarti kelaarti		Least concern
Scaly-breasted munia	Lonchura punctulata	Lonchura punctulata punctulata		Least concern
Tricoloured munia	Lonchura malacca			Least concern
Chestnut munia	Lonchura atricapilla			Least concern (A)
Java sparrow	Padda oryzivora		Introduced	(I)

== Old World sparrows ==
Order: Passeriformes Family: Passeridae

Sparrows are small passerine birds. In general, sparrows tend to be small, plump, brown or grey birds with short tails and short powerful beaks. Sparrows are seed eaters, but they also consume small insects.

Name	Binomial	Subspecies	Status	IUCN
House sparrow	Passer domesticus	Passer domesticus indicus	Resident	Least concern
Eurasian tree sparrow	Passer montanus			Least concern (A)
Yellow-throated sparrow	Gymnoris xanthocollis			Least concern (A)

== Wagtails and pipits ==
Order: Passeriformes Family: Motacillidae

Motacillidae is a family of small passerine birds with medium to long tails. They include the wagtails, longclaws and pipits. They are slender, ground feeding insectivores of open country.

Name	Binomial	Subspecies	Status	IUCN
Forest wagtail	Dendronanthus indicus			Least concern
Grey wagtail	Motacilla cinerea			Least concern
Western yellow wagtail	Motacilla flava	Motacilla flava beema		Least concern
Eastern yellow wagtail	Motacilla tschutschensis			Least concern (A)
Citrine wagtail	Motacilla citreola			Least concern (A)
White-browed wagtail	Motacilla maderaspatensis			Least concern (A)
White wagtail	Motacilla alba			Least concern
Richard's pipit	Anthus richardi			Least concern
Paddyfield pipit	Anthus rufulus	Anthus rufulus malayensis		Least concern
Blyth's pipit	Anthus godlewskii			Least concern
Tawny pipit	Anthus campestris			Least concern (A)
Olive-backed pipit	Anthus hodgsoni			Least concern (A)
Red-throated pipit	Anthus cervinus			Least concern (A)

== Finches, euphonias, and allies ==
Order: Passeriformes Family: Fringillidae

Finches are seed-eating passerine birds, that are small to moderately large and have a strong beak, usually conical and in some species very large. All have twelve tail feathers and nine primaries. These birds have a bouncing flight with alternating bouts of flapping and gliding on closed wings, and most sing well.

Name	Binomial	Subspecies	Status	IUCN
Common rosefinch	Carpodacus erythrinus			Least concern (A)

== Old World buntings ==
Order: Passeriformes Family: Emberizidae

The buntings are a large family of passerine birds. They are seed-eating birds with distinctively shaped bills. Many buntings have distinctive head patterns.

Name	Binomial	Subspecies	Status	IUCN
Black-headed bunting	Emberiza melanocephala			Least concern (A)
Red-headed bunting	Emberiza bruniceps			Least concern (A)
Grey-necked bunting	Emberiza buchanani			Least concern (A)

== See also ==
- List of endemic birds of Sri Lanka
- Lists of birds by region
