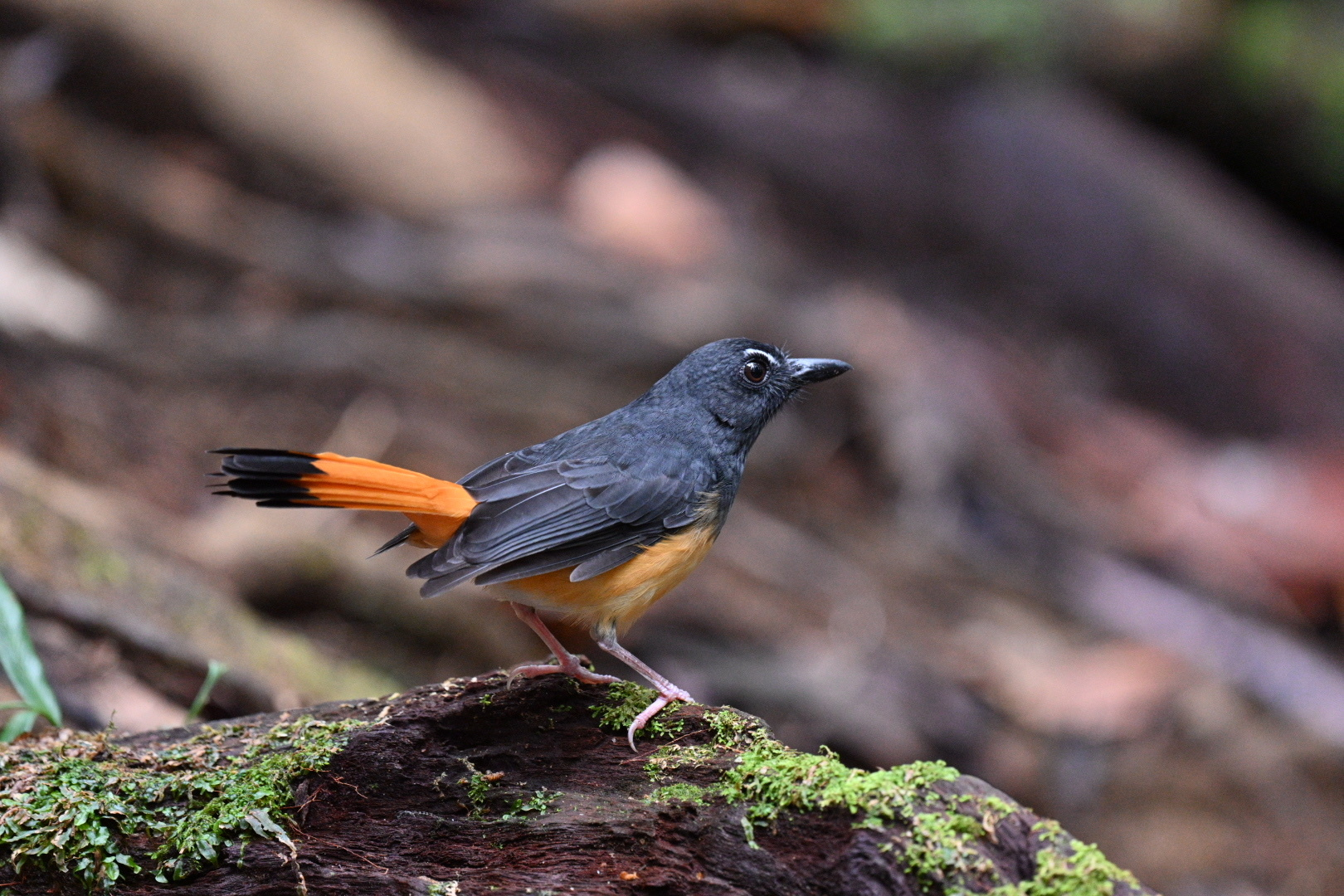

Conservation status
- Near Threatened (IUCN 3.1)

Scientific classification
- Kingdom: Animalia
- Phylum: Chordata
- Class: Aves
- Order: Passeriformes
- Family: Muscicapidae
- Genus: Copsychus
- Species: C. pyrropygus

Binomial name
- Copsychus pyrropygus (Lesson, 1839)

Synonyms
- Trichixos pyrropyga Lesson, 1839 [orth. error]; Copsychus pyrropyga

= Rufous-tailed shama =

Species of bird

The rufous-tailed shama (Copsychus pyrropygus) is a species of passerine bird in the Old World flycatcher family Muscicapidae. It is found in extreme southern Thailand, Malaysia, Sumatra, and Borneo, where its natural habitats are subtropical or tropical moist lowland forests and subtropical or tropical swamps. It is threatened by habitat loss.

This species was formerly placed in the monotypic genus Trichixos but was moved to Copsychus based on the results of a molecular phylogenetic study published in 2010.
