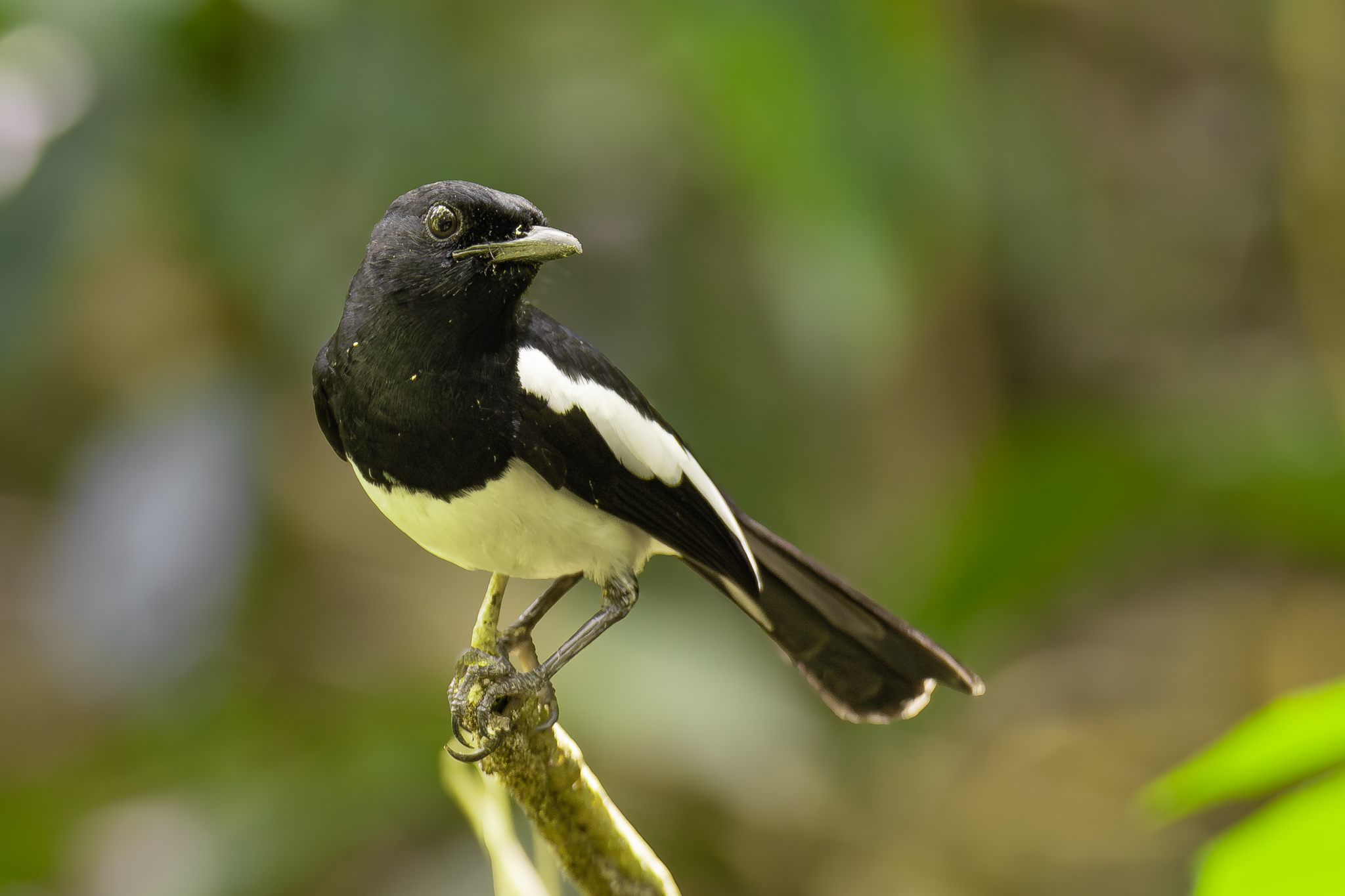
- Male
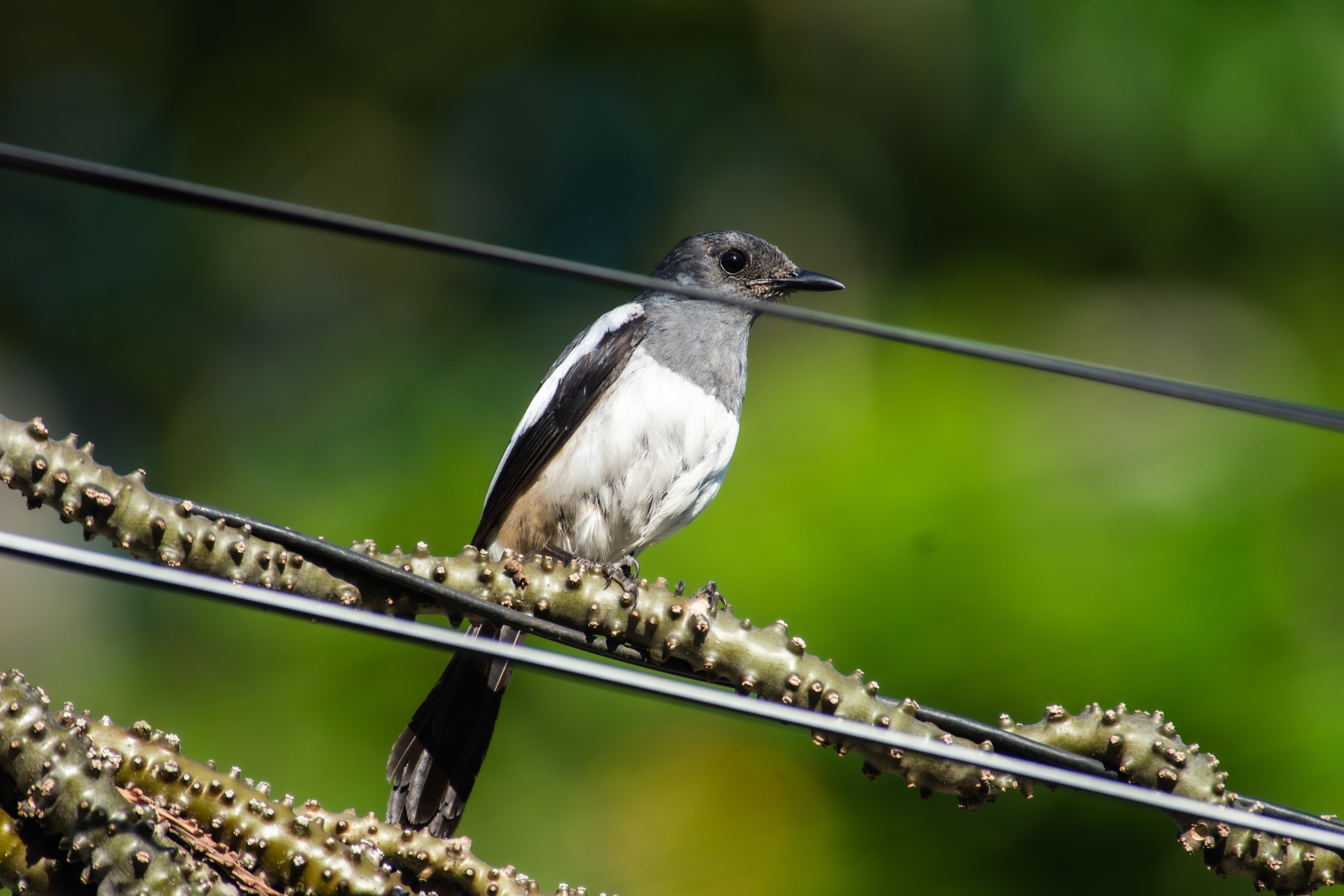
- Female

Conservation status
- Least Concern (IUCN 3.1)

Scientific classification
- Kingdom: Animalia
- Phylum: Chordata
- Class: Aves
- Order: Passeriformes
- Family: Muscicapidae
- Genus: Copsychus
- Species: C. mindanensis

Binomial name
- Copsychus mindanensis (Boddaert, 1783)

= Philippine magpie-robin =

Species of bird

The Philippine magpie-robin (Copsychus mindanensis) is a species of bird in the family Muscicapidae. It is endemic to the Philippines. It was formerly a subspecies of Oriental magpie-robin but was designated as its own species.

It has a wide range of habitat including open forest, second growth, cultivated areas, gardens and agricultural areas up to 1,000 meters above sea level.

== Description and taxonomy ==
The Philippine magpie-robin was described by the French polymath Georges-Louis Leclerc, Comte de Buffon in 1775 in his Histoire Naturelle des Oiseaux from a specimen collected on the island of Mindanao in the Philippines. The bird was also illustrated in a hand-coloured plate engraved by François-Nicolas Martinet in the Planches Enluminées D'Histoire Naturelle which was produced under the supervision of Edme-Louis Daubenton to accompany Buffon's text. Neither the plate caption nor Buffon's description included a scientific name but in 1783 the Dutch naturalist Pieter Boddaert coined the binomial name Turdus mindanensis in his catalogue of the Planches Enluminées. The Philippine magpie-robin is now one of 12 species placed in the genus Copsychus that was introduced by the German naturalist Johann Georg Wagler in 1827. It was formerly considered as a subspecies of the oriental magpie-robin (Copsychus saularis) but was promoted to species status based on the results of a molecular phylogenetic study that was published in 2009. The species is monotypic. The genus name Copsychus is from the Ancient Greek kopsukhos or kopsikhos for a "blackbird". The specific mindanensis comes from "Mindanao", the type locality.

It differs from the Oriental magpie-robin with its white belly, all black tail, paler gray throat and breast in female, smaller size especially its bill and wing It also considerably differs vocally.

== Ecology and behavior ==
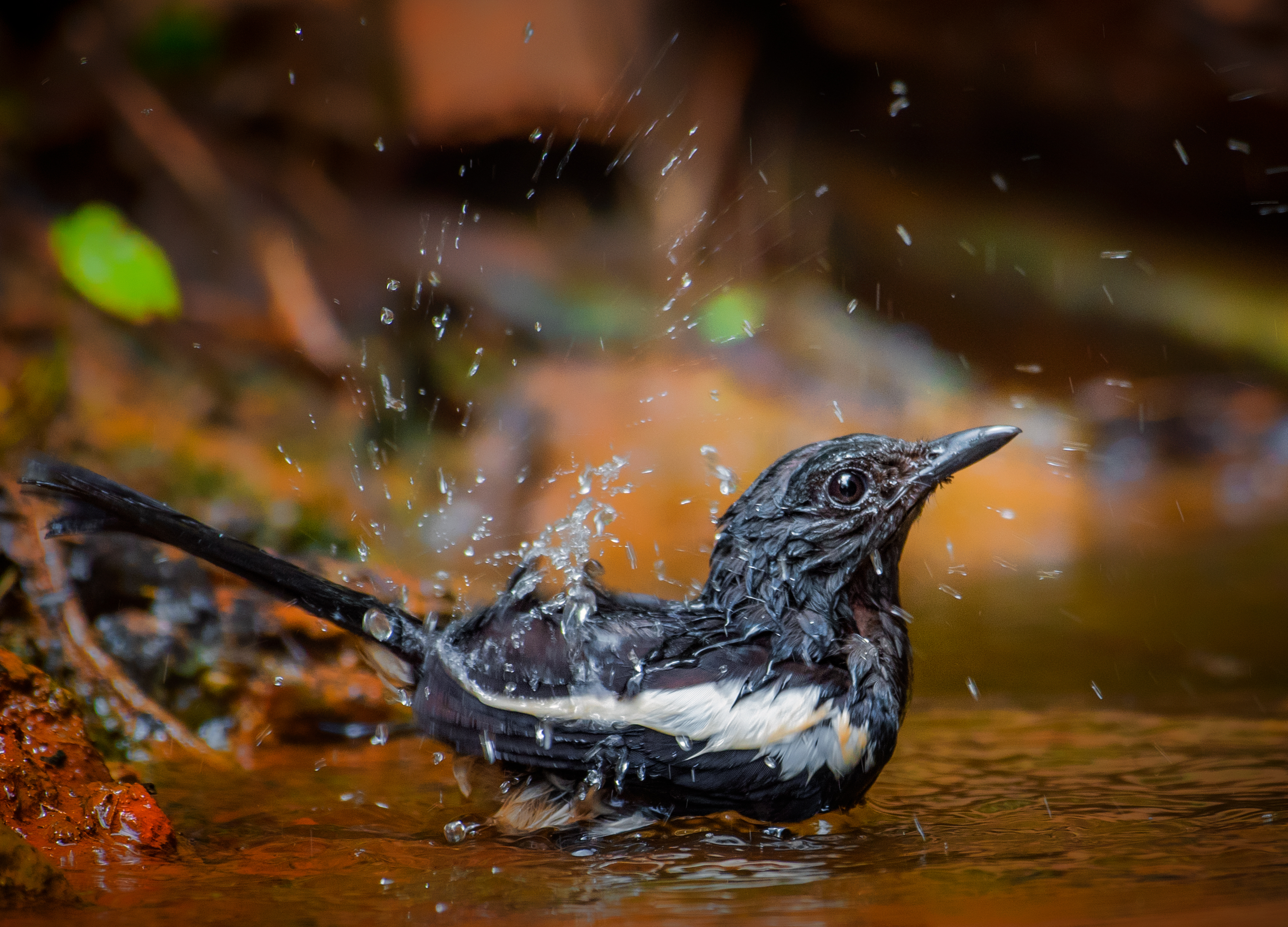
Bathing

Not much data on the diet of this specific species. Diet consists mostly of insects, small vertebrate, seeds and fruit. Forages on the ground and vegetation.

Breeding season is from April to July. Nest is an untidy cup made from grass, roots and fibres on bamboo clumps, trunks, branches and even on man made structures. Clutch size is usually 2 eggs.

== Habitat and conservation status ==
This species is extremely adaptable to almost any habitat except montane forest, found in lowland forest, second growth, agricultural areas, scrub and parks. The IUCN has classified the species as least concern as it is common throughout its wide range. Its adaptabllity to able to thrive in degraded habitat has made one of the few Philippine endemic birds that does not have a declining population.
