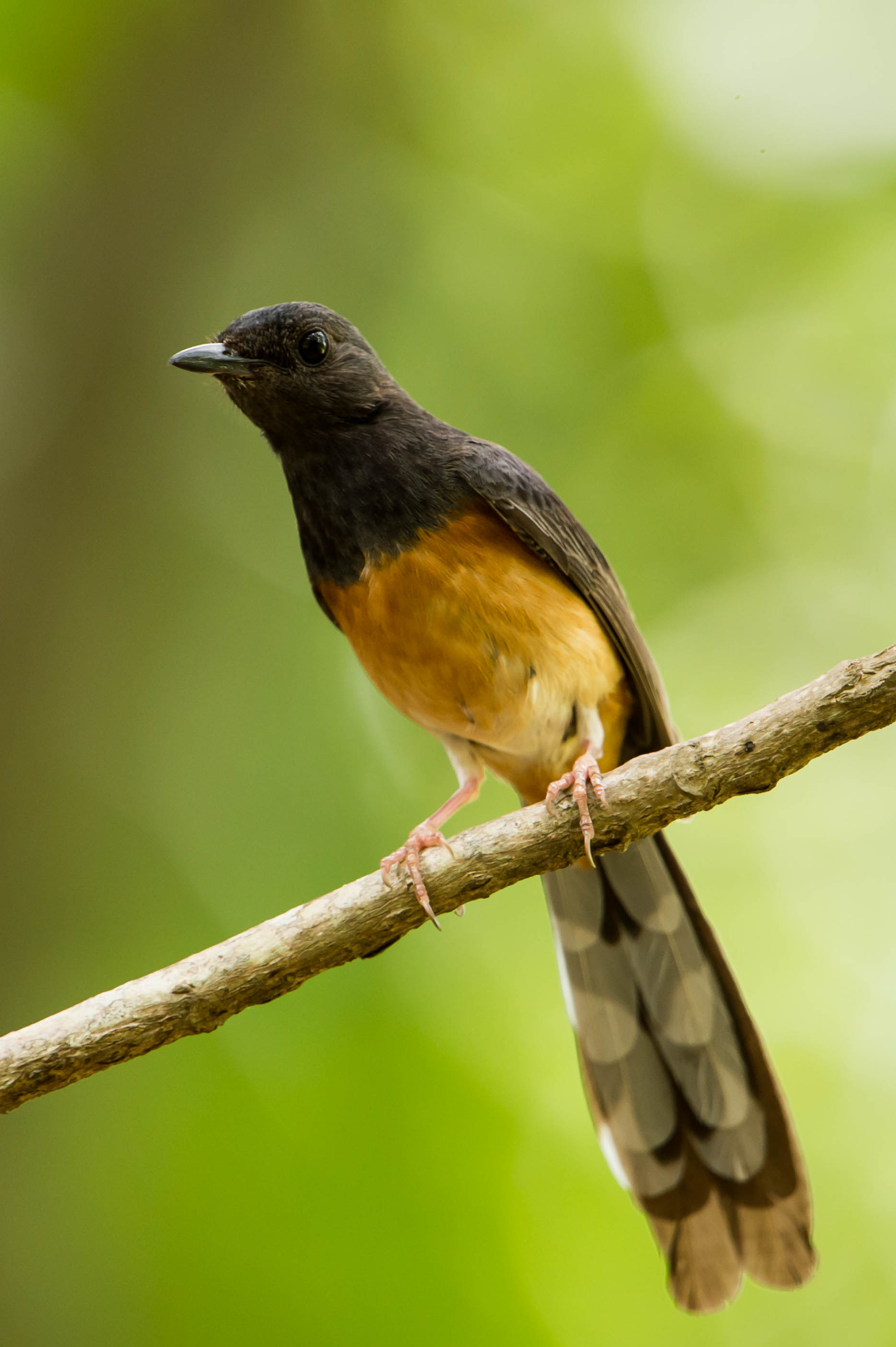
- Male white-rumped shama (Copsychus malabaricus)

Scientific classification
- Kingdom: Animalia
- Phylum: Chordata
- Class: Aves
- Order: Passeriformes
- Family: Muscicapidae
- Genus: Copsychus; Wagler, 1827

Type species
- Gracula saularis Linnaeus, 1758

Species
- see text

= Magpie-robin =

Magpie-robins

Genus of birds

The magpie-robins or shamas (from shama, Bengali and Hindi for C. malabaricus) are medium-sized insectivorous birds (some also eat berries and other fruit) in the genus Copsychus. They were formerly in the thrush family Turdidae, but are now treated as part of the Old World flycatcher family Muscicapidae. They are garden- and forest-dwelling species found in Africa and Asia.

The genus Copsychus was introduced by the German naturalist Johann Georg Wagler in 1827. The type species was subsequently designated as the oriental magpie-robin (Copsychus saularis) by the English zoologist George Robert Gray in 1840. The name Copsychus is from the Ancient Greek kopsukhos or kopsikhos, meaning "blackbird".

The genus contains 17 species:

Image	Scientific name	Common name	Distribution
	Copsychus saularis	Oriental magpie-robin	Bangladesh, India, Sri Lanka, eastern Pakistan, eastern Indonesia, Thailand, southern China, Malaysia and Singapore
	Copsychus sechellarum	Seychelles magpie-robin	the Seychelles
	Copsychus mindanensis	Philippine magpie-robin	the Philippines
	Copsychus albospecularis	Madagascar magpie-robin	Madagascar
	Copsychus pyrropygus	Rufous-tailed shama	southern Thailand, Malaysia, Sumatra and Borneo
	Copsychus fulicatus	Indian robin	Bangladesh, Bhutan, India, Nepal, Pakistan and Sri Lanka
	Copsychus luzoniensis	White-browed shama	the Philippines
	Copsychus superciliaris	Visayan shama	Visayan Islands in the Philippines
	Copsychus niger	White-vented shama	Palawan, Balabac and Calamian in the Philippines
	Copsychus cebuensis	Black shama	Cebu in the Philippines
	Copsychus albiventris	Andaman shama	the Andaman Islands
	Copsychus omissus (split from C. malabaricus)	Larwo shama	Java
	Copsychus stricklandii	White-crowned shama	north Borneo and Banggi
	Copsychus barbouri (split from C. stricklandii)	Maratua shama	Maratua (extinct in the wild)
	Copsychus nigricauda (split from C. malabaricus)	Kangean shama	Kangean Islands (probably extinct in the wild)
	Copsychus leggei (split from C. malabaricus)	Sri Lanka shama	Sri Lanka
	Copsychus malabaricus	White-rumped shama	India, Nepal, Bangladesh, Myanmar, Laos, Thailand, Vietnam, Cambodia, Hong Kong, Taiwan, Malaysia, Java, Borneo

The Seychelles magpie-robin is one of the most endangered birds in the world, with a population of less than 250, although this is a notable increase from just 16 in 1970.
