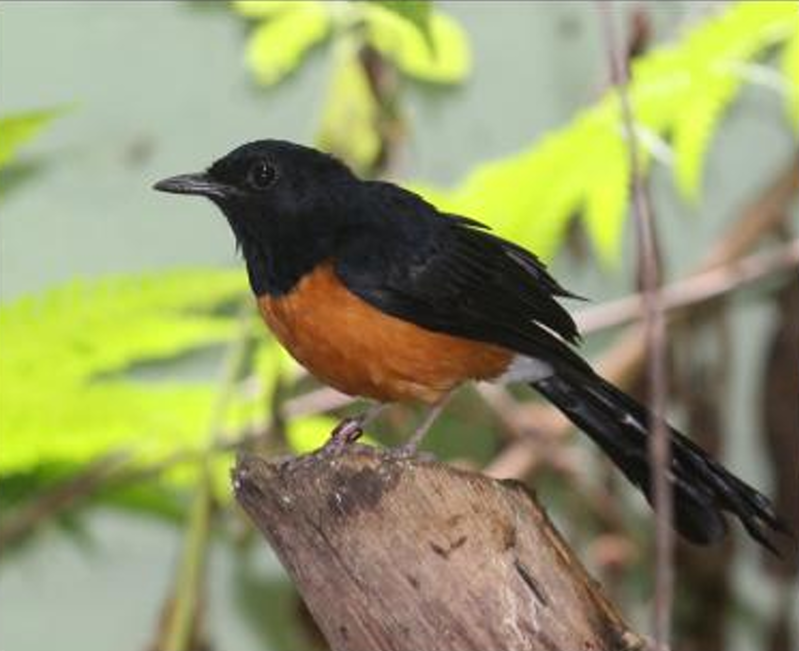

Conservation status
- Not evaluated (IUCN 3.1)

Scientific classification
- Kingdom: Animalia
- Phylum: Chordata
- Class: Aves
- Order: Passeriformes
- Family: Muscicapidae
- Genus: Copsychus
- Species: C. nigricauda

Binomial name
- Copsychus nigricauda (Vorderman, 1893)

= Kangean shama =

Species of bird

The Kangean shama (Copsychus nigricauda) is a medium sized passerine bird in the Old World flycatcher family Muscicapidae that is endemic to the Kangean Islands in Indonesia. It was formerly considered to be conspecific with the white-rumped shama. The species may be extinct in the wild.

== Taxonomy ==
The Kangean shama was formally described in 1893 by the Dutch scientist Adolphe Vorderman under the binomial name Cittocincla nigricauda. The specific epithet combines the Latin niger meaning "black" with cauda meaning "tail". The Kangean shama is now placed with 16 other species in the genus Copsychus that was introduced in 1827 by the German naturalist Johann Georg Wagler. It was formerly considered as subspecies of the white-rumped shama (Copsychus malabaricus) but is now treated as a separate species based on morphological differences and a molecular genetic study of museum specimens published in 2022. The species is monotypic: no subspecies are recognised.

== Description ==
The Kangean shama has glossy blue-black upperparts, bright chestnut underparts apart from a white vent, a white rump and an almost entirely black tail with white tips to the outer feathers. The sexes are similar in plumage but the tail is shorter in females.

== Conservation status ==
The Kangean shama is highly threatened by the pet trade and is possibly extinct in the wild.
