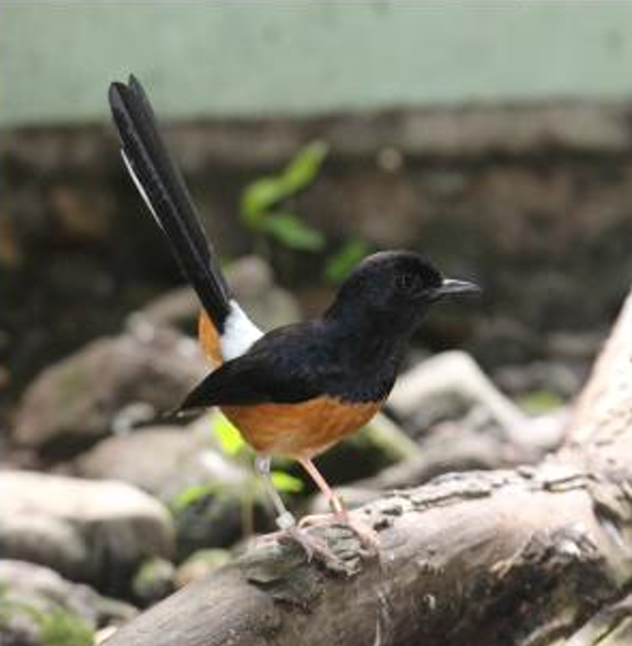

Conservation status
- Not evaluated (IUCN 3.1)

Scientific classification
- Kingdom: Animalia
- Phylum: Chordata
- Class: Aves
- Order: Passeriformes
- Family: Muscicapidae
- Genus: Copsychus
- Species: C. omissus

Binomial name
- Copsychus omissus (Hartert, EJO, 1902)

= Larwo shama =

Species of bird

The Larwo shama (Copsychus omissus) is a medium sized passerine bird in the Old World flycatcher family Muscicapidae. It is native to central and eastern Java. It was formerly considered to be conspecific with the white-rumped shama.

== Taxonomy ==
The Larwo shama was formally described in 1902 by the German ornithologist Ernst Hartert based on specimens collected near Lawang, Malang in eastern Java. He considered his specimens to be from a subspecies of the Kittacincla macrurus (now a subspecies of the white-rumped shama) and coined the trinomial name Kittacincla macrurus omissa. The epithet omissa is Latin meaning "disregarded" or "omitted". The common name "Larwo" is a name used in the Indonesian language for this species. The Larwo shama is now placed with 16 other species in the genus Copsychus that was introduced in 1827 by the German naturalist Johann Georg Wagler. It was formerly considered as subspecies of the white-rumped shama (Copsychus malabaricus) but is now treated as a separate species based on a molecular genetic study of museum specimens published in 2022.

Two subspecies are recognised:

- C. o. javanus (Kloss, 1921) – central Java
- C. o. omissus (Hartert, EJO, 1902) – east Java

There is very little difference in morphology between the two subspecies.

Both subspecies are now very rare.
