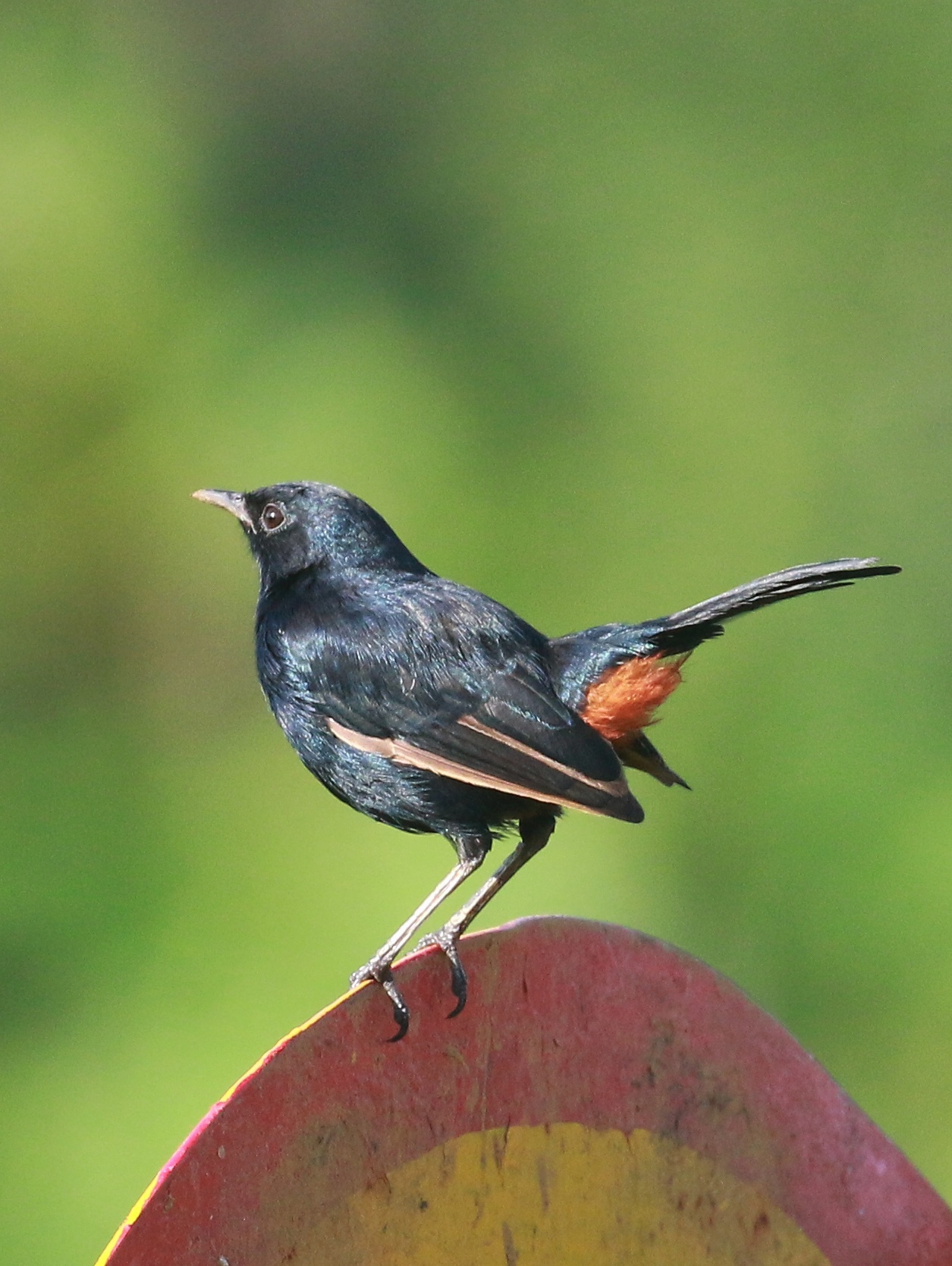
- Male C. f. fulicatus from Kerala
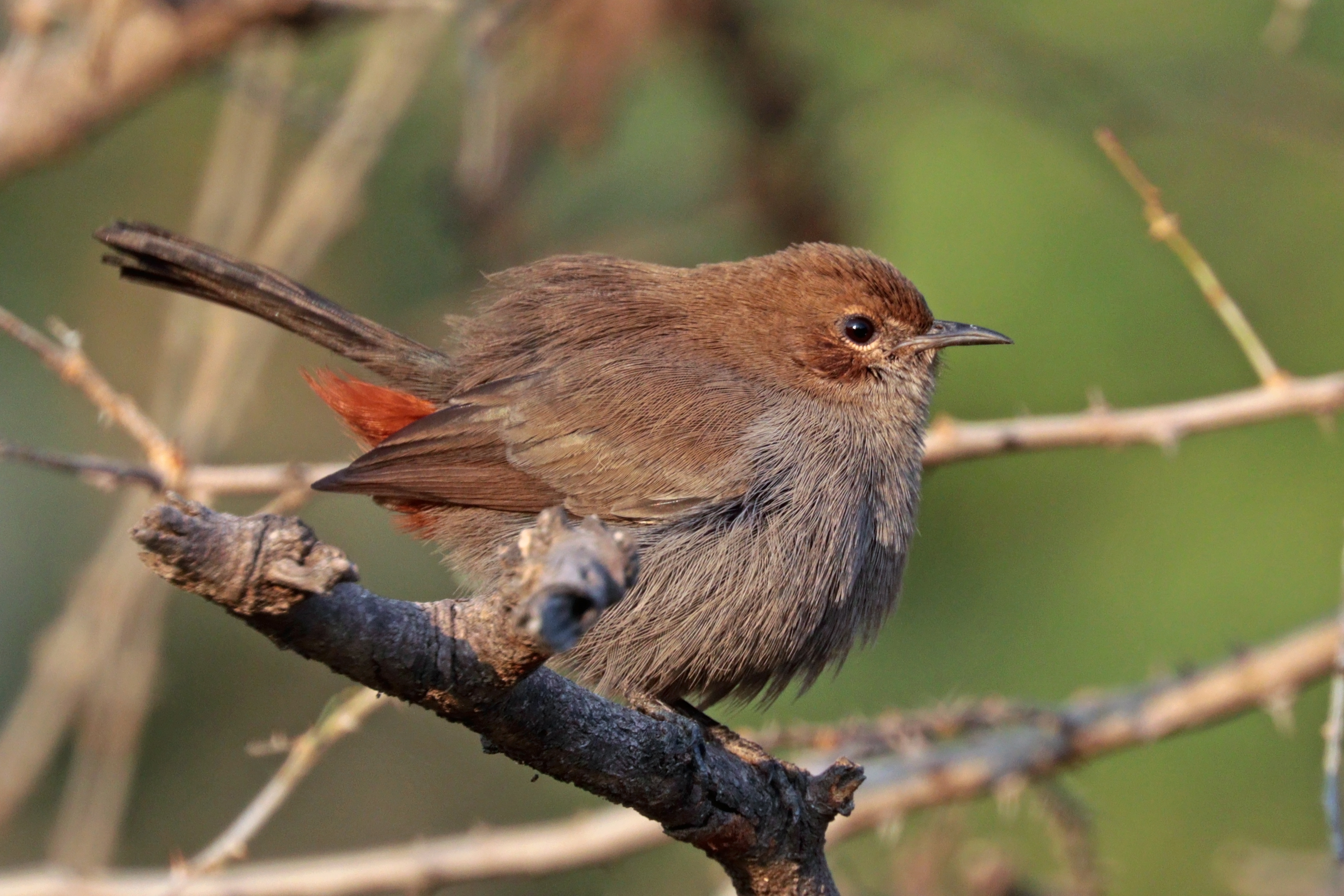
- Female of subspecies cambaiensis (Rajasthan)

Conservation status
- Least Concern (IUCN 3.1)

Scientific classification
- Kingdom: Animalia
- Phylum: Chordata
- Class: Aves
- Order: Passeriformes
- Family: Muscicapidae
- Genus: Copsychus
- Species: C. fulicatus

Binomial name
- Copsychus fulicatus (Linnaeus, 1766)

Synonyms
- Motacilla fulicata Linnaeus, 1766; Saxicoloides fulicata (Linnaeus, 1766); Sylvia cambaiensis (Latham, 1790); Thamnobia cambaiensis (Latham, 1790); Thamnobia fulicata (Linnaeus, 1766); Sylvia ptymatura

= Indian robin =

Species of bird

The Indian robin (Copsychus fulicatus) (Note: Rasmussen & Anderton emend the species epithet from fulicata to fulicatus since Saxicola is masculine and the -oides ending is always masculine according to ICZN Code 30.1.4.4. ICZN Code. See also David, Normand; Gosselin, Michel (2002). "The grammatical gender of avian genera". Bulletin of the British Ornithologists' Club. 122 (4): 257–282.) is a species of passerine bird in the family Muscicapidae. It is widespread in the Indian subcontinent and ranges across Bangladesh, Bhutan, India, Nepal, Pakistan and Sri Lanka. The males of the northern subspecies have brown backs whose extent gradually reduces southwards, with the males of the southern subspecies having all-black backs. They are commonly found in open scrub areas and often seen running along the ground or perching on low thorny shrubs and rocks. The long tail is usually held up and the chestnut undertail coverts and dark body make them easily distinguishable from pied bushchats and Oriental magpie-robins.

== Taxonomy ==
In 1760, the French zoologist Mathurin Jacques Brisson included a description of the Indian robin in his Ornithologie based on a specimen that he mistakenly believed had been collected in the Philippines. He used the French name Le grand traquet des Philippines and the Latin Rubetra Philippensis Major. Although Brisson coined Latin names, these do not conform to the binomial system and are not recognised by the International Commission on Zoological Nomenclature. When the Swedish naturalist Carl Linnaeus updated his Systema Naturae for the 12th edition in 1766, he added 240 species that had been previously described by Brisson. One of these was the Indian robin. Linnaeus included a brief description, coined the binomial name Motacilla fulicata and cited Brisson's work. The type location was subsequently corrected to Puducherry in southern India. The specific name is from the Latin fulicatus for "dusky" or "black".

Calls

The Indian robin was formerly placed in the monotypic genus Saxicoloides. It was moved to Copsychus based on the results of molecular phylogenetic studies of birds in the family Muscicapidae.

== Description ==
The Indian robin is sexually dimorphic in plumage, with the male being mainly black with a white shoulder patch or stripe whose visible extent can vary with posture. The northern populations have the upper plumage brownish, while the southern populations are black above. The males have chestnut undertail coverts and these are visible as the bird usually holds the 6–8 cm long tail raised upright. The females are brownish above, have no white shoulder stripe and are greyish below, with the vent a paler shade of chestnut than the males. Birds of the northern populations are larger than those from southern India or Sri Lanka. Juvenile birds are much like females, but the throat is mottled.

Several subspecies are named based on their plumage differences. The nominate subspecies refers to the population found across southern peninsular India. The subspecies leucopterus is found in Sri Lanka. In the two subspecies cambaiensis of northern and north-western India and erythrura (=erythrurus) of north-eastern India (south to around Sambalpur), the males have brown backs. The subspecies intermedius includes birds in appearance between cambaiensis, erythrura and fulicata, the last one found in central India and parts of the Deccan region. The subspecies munda was named based on a specimen from the Punjab, but it is now considered synonymous with cambaiensis. Older classifications treat the population in southern India as the subspecies ptymatura while considering the type locality as Sri Lanka, although it has subsequently been restricted to Pondicherry.

Local names recorded by Jerdon include Nalanchi (Telugu), Wannatikuruvi (Tamil, Washerman bird), Dayaal (Marathi) Kalchuri (Hindi) and Paan kiriththaa (Sinhala). The former genus name indicates that it looks similar to Saxicola, the genus of the pied bushchat, a bird often found in similar habitats.

== Distribution and habitat ==
This bird is found in open stony, grassy and scrub forest habitats. They are mainly found in dry habitats and are mostly absent from the thicker forest regions and high rainfall areas. All populations are resident and non-migratory. The species is often found close to human habitation and will frequently perch on rooftops.

The species was introduced into the New York region, but did not become established there. A vagrant or escape has been noted from the Maldives.

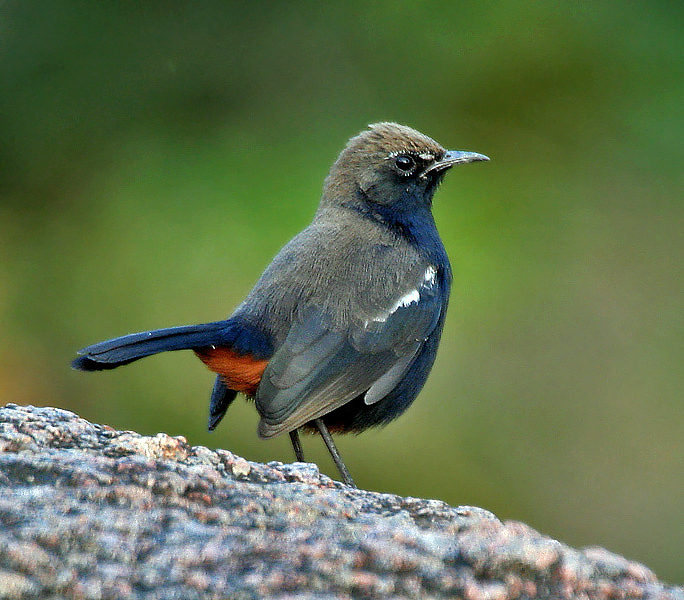
Male from Andhra Pradesh, showing features of intermedius

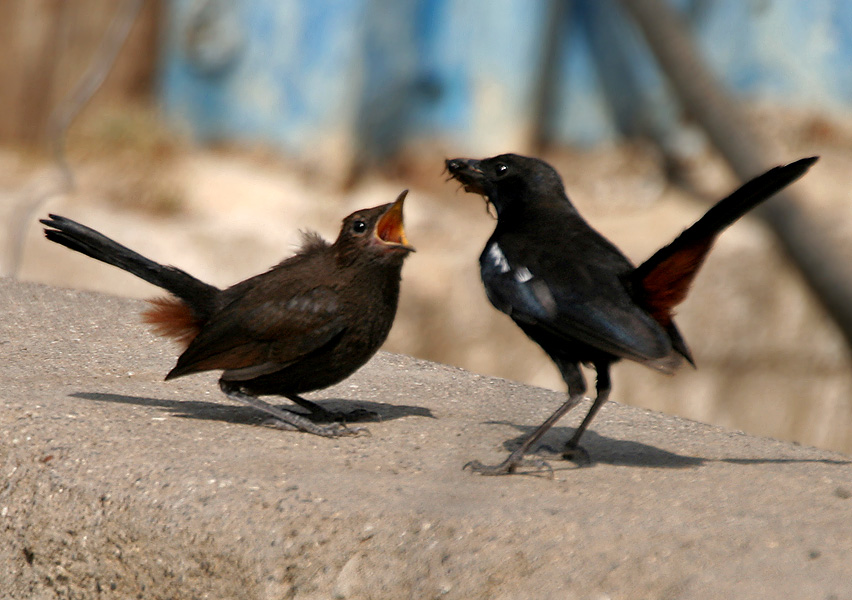
Male feeding young (Maharashtra, India)

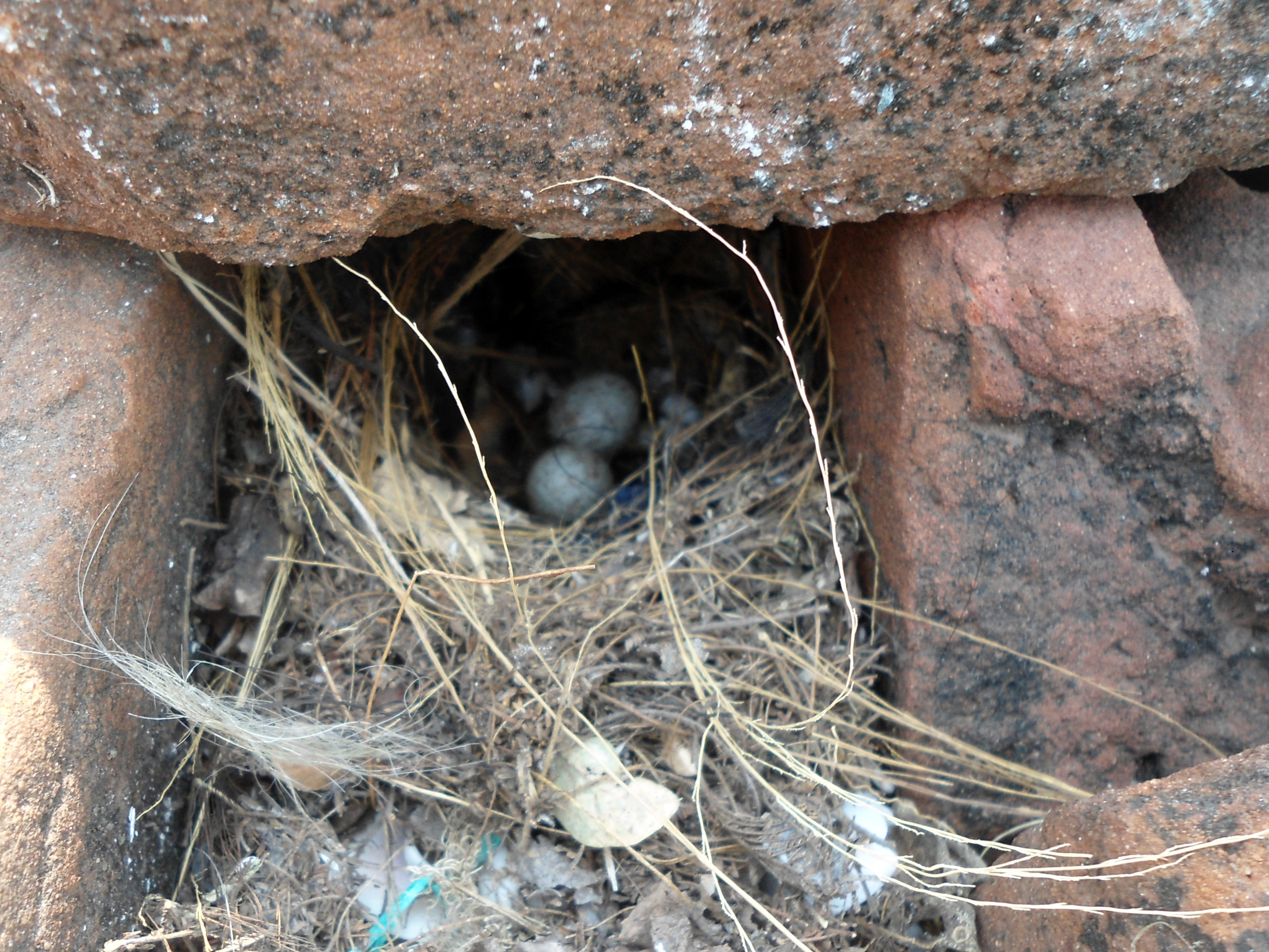
Nest with eggs

== Ecology ==
Population densities of 193-240 individuals per square km have been estimated in the Pondicherry University campus. The ratio of males to females was about 1.5:1. Territory size for males is estimated at about 6650 m^{2}. Males can be aggressive to others during the breeding season and will even attack reflections. Human activities such as felling and firewood removal in forests appear to benefit them.

=== Food ===
They feed mostly on insects but are known to take frogs and lizards especially when feeding young at the nest. Individuals may forage late in the evening to capture insects attracted to lights.

=== Breeding ===
The breeding season is December to September, but varies according to region and usually begins with the first rains. Peak breeding in northern India is in June and is earlier in Southern India. In Sri Lanka, breeding is in March to June and August to September. Males sing during this season and display by lowering and spreading their tail feathers and strutting around the female, displaying their sides and fluffing their undertail coverts. The songs of males have variants for inviting mates and for deterring other males. Males will drive away other males and patrol their territory by flying with slow wing beats from perch to perch. They may sometimes peck at their reflections. An aggressive display involves fluffing up the feathers and holding the bill high.

Nests are built between rocks, in holes in walls or in a tree hollow and are lined with animal hair. It has been noted that many of them are also lined with pieces of snakeskin sloughs. The eggs are of regular oval form, but many are elongated and a few pointed. They have a fair amount of gloss. The ground colour is white, often tinged with faint green or pink which is rather closely spotted, speckled, streaked, or mottled with rich reddish- or umber-brown and brownish-yellow with some underlying lavender. The markings are denser at the larger end of the egg, where they form an irregular cap. Some eggs are blotched with dark reddish-brown at the large end. They are about 0.76–0.84 inches (1.9–2.1 cm) long and 0.55–0.62 inches (1.4–1.6 cm) wide. Three to four eggs is the usual clutch. An abnormal clutch of seven has been noted, although none of the eggs hatched at this nest. Only the female incubates the eggs, which then hatch in about 10–12 days. The chicks have black down. Both males and females feed the young, the male sometimes passing food to the female who, in turn, feeds the young. Nestlings may feign death (thanatosis) when handled and may be preyed on by the rufous treepie. The same nest site may be reused in subsequent years.

An old anecdotal record of these birds laying their eggs in the nests of Turdoides babblers has not been supported by later observers. Laboratory studies have demonstrated cyclic changes in the melanin pigmentation of the tissue surrounding the testes. The dark pigmentation is lost during the breeding season and regained later.

=== Parasites ===
Several parasites, including a cestode, have been identified in this species.

== Other sources ==
- George, JC (1963) Some observations on the breeding behaviour of the Indian Robin, Saxicoloides fulicata (Linnaeus). Pavo 1(2):71-78.
- Magon, VK (1979) Distribution of acid phosphatase in the digestive system of two Indian birds, Uroloncha malabarica and Saxicoloides fulicata. Pavo 17(1&2):27-32.
- Rajvanshi, G; Gupta, MM; Yeshowardhana; Singh, VS. (1985) Histochemical localization of calcium and iron in the gonad of male Indian Robin (Saxicoloides fulicata). Pavo 23(1&2):31-36.
- Rajvanshi, G; Gupta, MM; Bhatnagar, VK; Bhatnagar, Sumar (1985) Cyclic changes in Carbohydrate localization in gonad of male Indian Robin Saxicoloides fulicata (Linn.). Pavo 23(1&2):41-46.
- Gupta, MM; Rajvanshi, G; Singh, VS. (1986) Histochemical localization of proteins and Tryptophane aminoacid in testis of Indian Robin Saxicoloides fulicata (Linn.). Pavo 24(1&2):69-76.
- Culshaw, JC (1948). "Some observations on the territories of Blackbacked Indian Robins Saxicoloides fulicata fulicata, Linn". J. Bengal Nat. Hist. Soc. 22 (3): 92.
- Stonor, CR (1944). "On the display of the Indian Robin, Saxicoloides fulicata (Linnaeus)". Ibis. 86 (1): 91–93. doi:10.1111/j.1474-919X.1944.tb07534.x.
