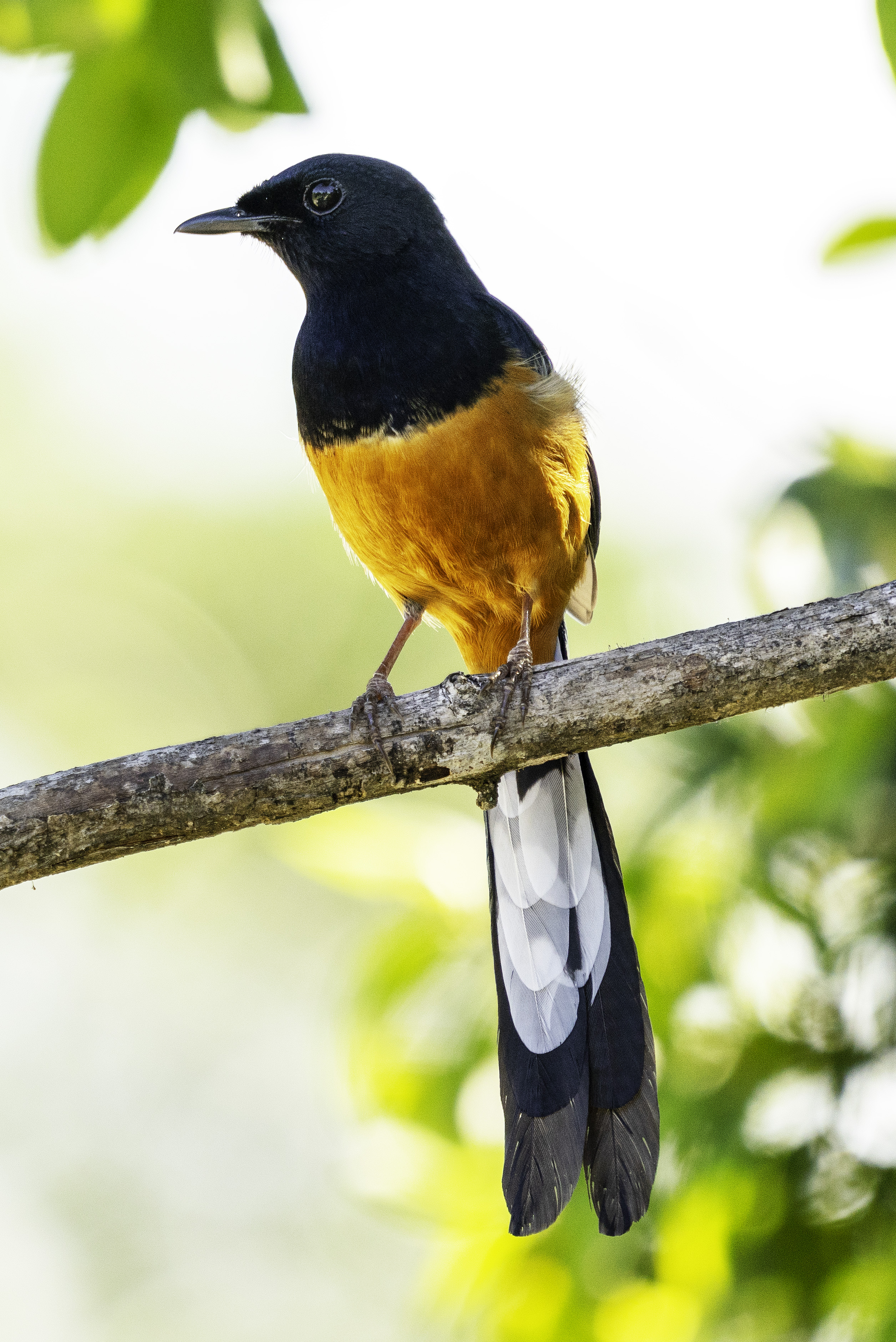
- Male

Conservation status
- Not evaluated (IUCN 3.1)

Scientific classification
- Kingdom: Animalia
- Phylum: Chordata
- Class: Aves
- Order: Passeriformes
- Family: Muscicapidae
- Genus: Copsychus
- Species: C. leggei

Binomial name
- Copsychus leggei (Whistler, 1941)

= Sri Lanka shama =

Species of bird

The Sri Lanka shama (Copsychus leggei) is a medium-sized passerine bird in the Old World flycatcher family Muscicapidae that is endemic to Sri Lanka. It was formerly considered to be conspecific with the white-rumped shama.

== Taxonomy ==
The Sri Lanka shama was formally described in 1941 by the English ornithologist Hugh Whistler as a subspecies of the white-rumped shama. He coined the trinomial name Kittacincla malabarica leggei where the epithet leggei was chosen to honour the memory of the ornithologist William Vincent Legge who had documented the birds of Sri Lanka. The Sri Lanka shama is now placed with 16 other species in the genus Copsychus that was introduced in 1827 by the German naturalist Johann Georg Wagler. It was formerly considered as subspecies of the white-rumped shama (Copsychus malabaricus) but is now treated as a separate species based on morphological differences and a molecular genetic study of museum specimens published in 2022. The species is monotypic, with no subspecies being recognised.

== Description ==
The Sri Lanka shama has glossy blue-black upperparts, bright chestnut underparts, a white rump and white outer tail feathers. The sexes are similar. Compared to the nominate subspecies of white-rumped shama that is present in India, the Sri Lanka shama has a shorter tail, paler belly and less sexual dimorphism.
