= Kleptotrichy =

Stealing of mammal hair for bird nests

Kleptotrichy is the stealing of mammal hair by birds for use in their nests.

The phenomenon was first defined scientifically in a journal article published in July 2021. Scientists largely studied it from videos posted to YouTube. The study found that the tufted titmouse was among the species of birds which most frequently engaged in kleptotrichy.
