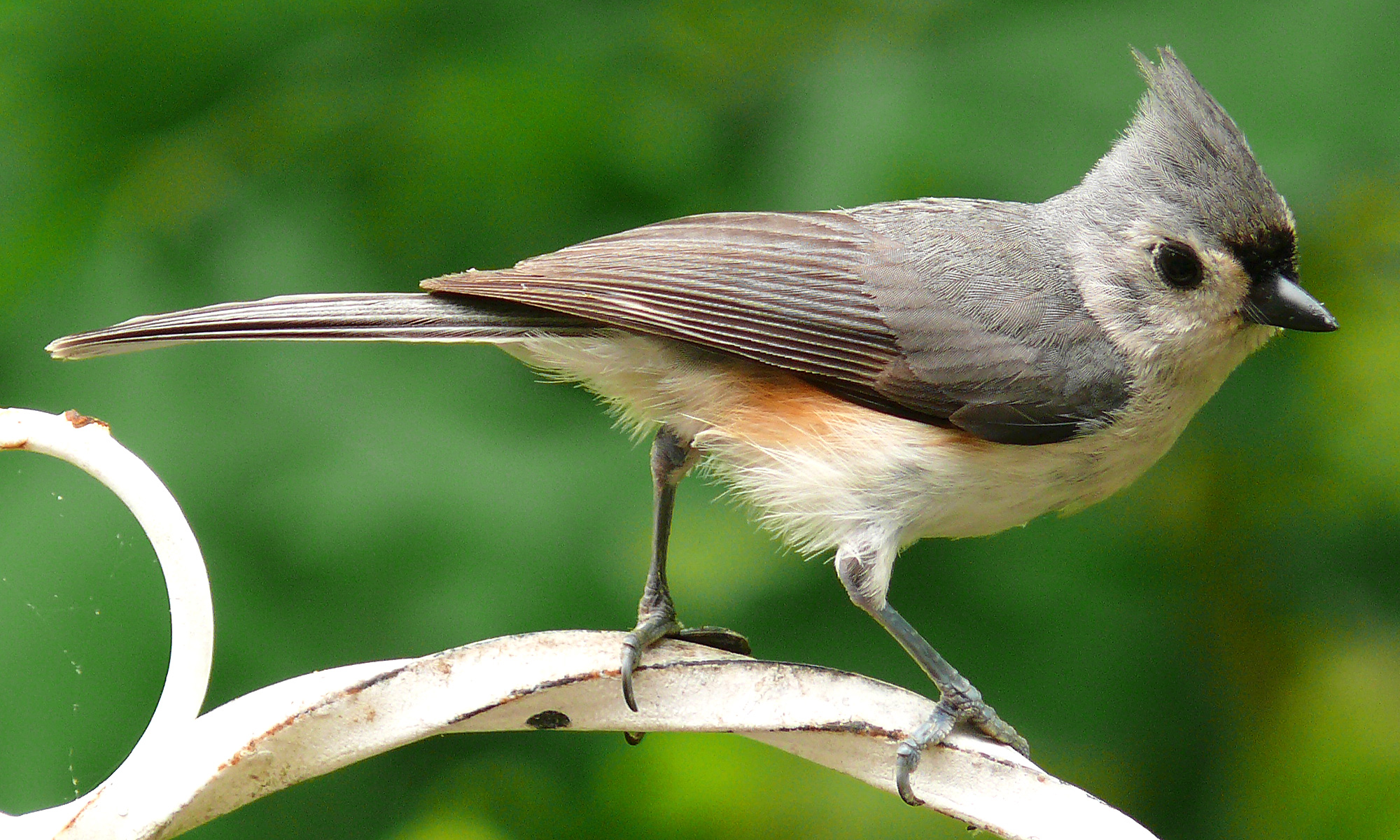
- Baeolophus bicolor

Scientific classification
- Kingdom: Animalia
- Phylum: Chordata
- Class: Aves
- Order: Passeriformes
- Family: Paridae
- Genus: Baeolophus; Cabanis, 1851

Type species
- Parus bicolor Linnaeus, 1766
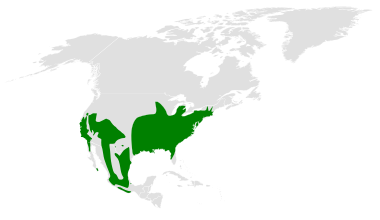
- Range of Baeolophus

= Baeolophus =

Titmouses

Genus of birds

Baeolophus is a genus of birds in the family Paridae, commonly called tits. Its members are known as titmouses or titmice. All the species are native to North America. In the past, most authorities retained Baeolophus as a subgenus within the genus Parus, but treatment as a distinct genus, initiated by the American Ornithological Society, is now widely accepted.

== Etymology ==
The genus name Baeolophus translates to small crested and is a compound of the Ancient Greek words βαιός : baiós - small, and λόφος : lόphοs - crest.

== Taxonomy ==
The genus contains the following five species:

Image	Scientific name	Common name	Distribution
	Baeolophus wollweberi	Bridled titmouse	Arizona and New Mexico to Southern Mexico
	Baeolophus inornatus	Oak titmouse	Pacific coast from Baja California to Oregon
	Baeolophus ridgwayi	Juniper titmouse	The Great Basin and adjacent areas
	Baeolophus bicolor	Tufted titmouse	Eastern half of the US and southeastern Canada
	Baeolophus atricristatus	Black-crested titmouse	Oklahoma and Texas to east-central Mexico
