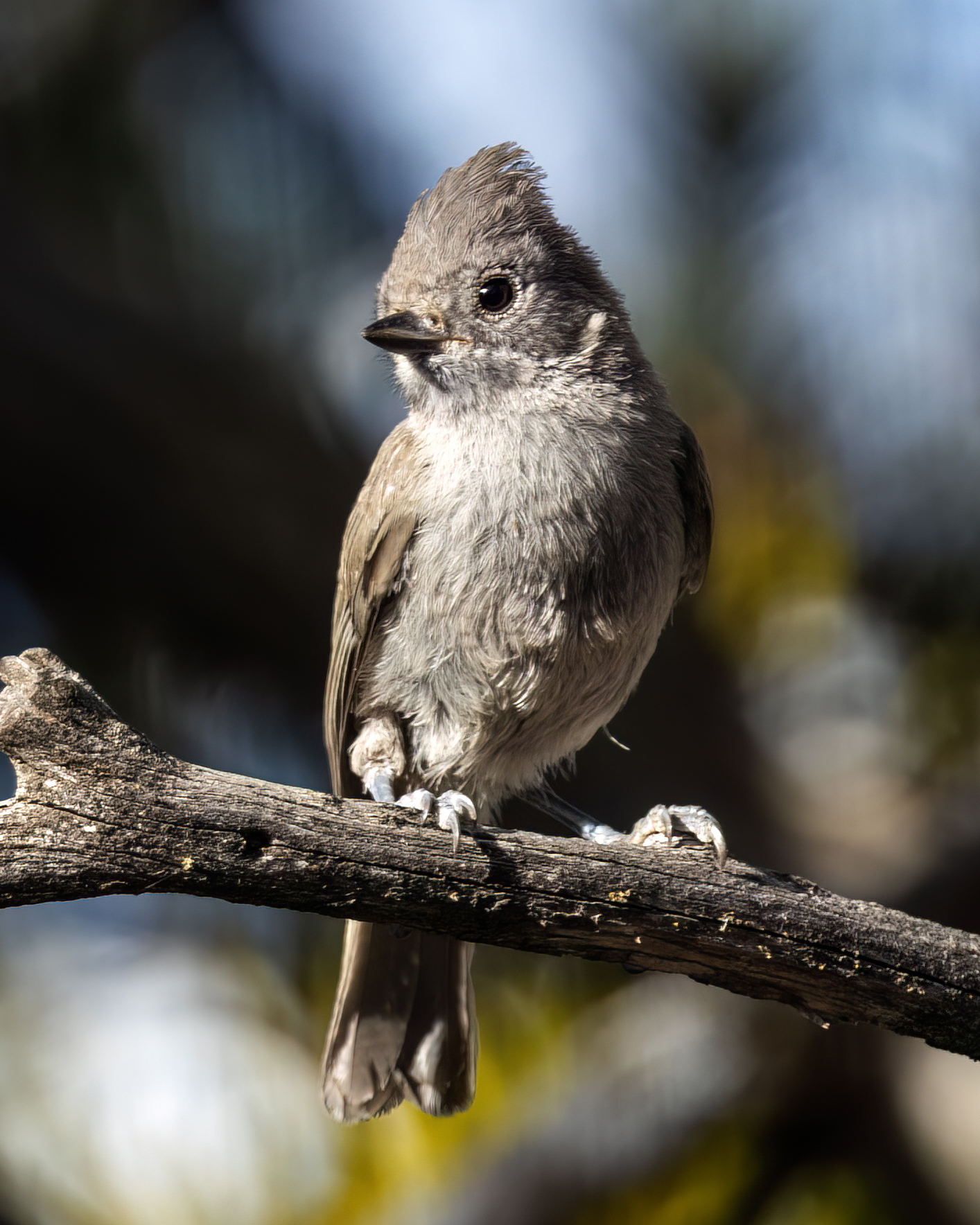

Conservation status
- Least Concern (IUCN 3.1)

Scientific classification
- Kingdom: Animalia
- Phylum: Chordata
- Class: Aves
- Order: Passeriformes
- Family: Paridae
- Genus: Baeolophus
- Species: B. ridgwayi

Binomial name
- Baeolophus ridgwayi (Richmond, 1902)
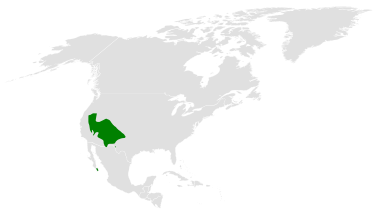
- Range of Baeolophus ridgwayi

Synonyms
- Baeolophus griseus

= Juniper titmouse =

Species of bird

The juniper titmouse (Baeolophus ridgwayi) is a passerine bird in the tit family Paridae. The American Ornithologists' Union split the plain titmouse into the oak titmouse and the juniper titmouse in 1996, due to distinct differences in song, preferred habitat, and genetic makeup.

The juniper titmouse is a small, gray bird with small tuft or crest. Male and female are visually similar.

This titmouse lives year-round primarily in the Great Basin, but is resident from southeastern Oregon and central Colorado south to the eastern Mojave Desert in California and central Arizona, as far as west Texas and extreme northeastern Sonora, Mexico-(the Madrean sky islands). It prefers open woodlands of warm, dry pinyon-juniper, juniper and desert riparian woods.

Juniper titmice will sleep in cavities, dense foliage, or birdhouses. When roosting in foliage, the titmouse chooses a twig surrounded by dense foliage or an accumulation of dead pine needles, simulating a roost in a cavity. It forms pairs or small groups, but does not form large flocks. It may join mixed-species flocks after breeding season for foraging.

The juniper titmouse eats insects and spiders, sometimes seen catching insects in mid air. It also eats berries, acorns, and some seeds, sometimes hammering seeds against branches to open them. The bird forages on foliage, twigs, branches, trunks, and occasionally on the ground. Strong legs and feet allows it to hang upside down to forage. Juniper titmice visit feeders with suet, peanut butter, and seeds.

The song of the juniper titmouse is a rolling series of notes given on the same pitch. Its call sounds like a raspy tschick-adee.

This species builds its nest in a woodpecker hole, natural cavity, or nest box, lining it with grass, moss, mud, hair, feathers, and fur. It breeds from March into July, with peak activity in April and May, laying 3–9 eggs, usually 4–7. The female is the primary incubator, the process of which takes 14–16 days. Young are altricial, and are tended by both parents in nest for 16–21 days. Parents continue to tend to young for another three to four weeks after the young leave the nest.

The oak titmouse and juniper titmouse appear almost identical, but differ in voice as well as range. The oak titmouse has a browner back than the juniper titmouse. The oak titmouse gives a repeated series of three to seven syllables, each composed of one low and one high note, while the juniper titmouse song consists of a series of rapid syllables on the same note. Ranges overlap only in a small area in California. The tufted titmouse, which does not overlap in range, has whiter belly, rusty flanks, and black on the forehead.
