= Oak titmouse =

- In Skyline Wilderness Park, California, United States

Conservation status
- Least Concern (IUCN 3.1)

Scientific classification
- Kingdom: Animalia
- Phylum: Chordata
- Class: Aves
- Order: Passeriformes
- Family: Paridae
- Genus: Baeolophus
- Species: B. inornatus

Binomial name
- Baeolophus inornatus (Gambel, 1845)
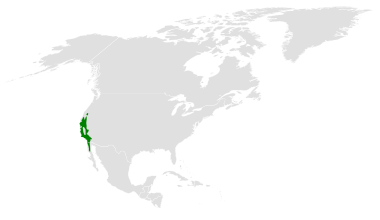
- Range of Baeolophus inornatus

Audio
- Calls from a pair foraging in Quercus agrifolia, McClellan Ranch Preserve, Santa Clara, California, US

Species of bird

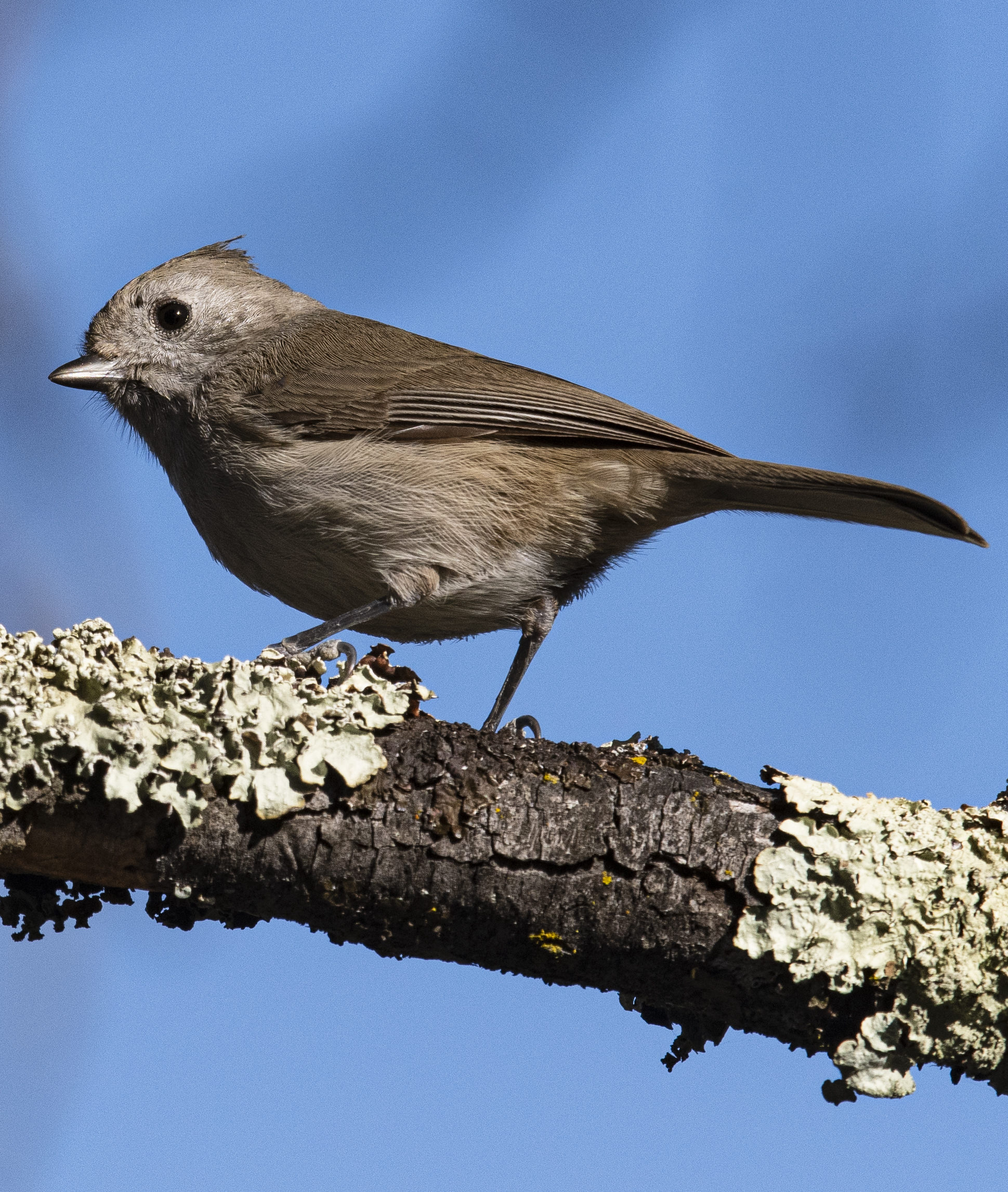
Oak titmouse, Auburn, California

The oak titmouse (Baeolophus inornatus) is a passerine bird in the tit family Paridae. The American Ornithologists' Union split the plain titmouse into the oak titmouse and the juniper titmouse in 1996, due to distinct differences in song, preferred habitat, and genetic makeup.

The oak titmouse is a small, brown-tinged gray bird with a small tuft or crest. The face is plain, and the undersides are a lighter gray. Sexes are similar, as there is very little to no sexual dimorphism.

== Ecology and behavior in California ==
This species lives year-round on the Pacific slope, resident from southern Oregon south through California west of the Sierra Nevada to Baja California, but its range surrounds the central San Joaquin Valley. It prefers open woodlands of warm, dry oak and oak-pine at low to mid-elevations but can also be found in forests as long as adequate oak trees are present. With these habitats, the oak titmouse lives typically in Quercus agrifolia (coast live oak) and Quercus lobata (valley oak); which provides sufficient cavities, dense foliage, and twig piles that those oaks provide, oak titmouse utilizes such sources for nesting.

However, the rural residential sprawl and vineyard development caused California oak woodlands to experience a rapid threat due to habitat fragmentation. Specifically, following with the low predation, it has contributed to oak titmouse’s high nest failure. Thus, in protecting such species, California habitat conservation actions are needed.

According to the Red List provided by the IUCN, the conservation status of oak titmouse is now listed as Least Concern. The population of California’s oak titmouse is under threat from many human activities, including increased wildfire frequency caused by humans, clearing for agriculture and urban expansion. These pressures have led to a steady decline in oak woodlands, resulting in habitat loss and negative impact on the oak titmouse population.

The oak titmouse will sleep in cavities, dense foliage, or birdhouses. When roosting in foliage, the titmouse chooses a twig surrounded by dense foliage or an accumulation of dead pine needles, simulating a roost in a cavity. It forms pairs or small groups, but does not form large flocks. It may join mixed-species flocks after the breeding season for foraging. Pairs stay together after the breeding season.

Oak titmice eat insects and spiders, and are sometimes seen catching insects in mid air. They will also take berries, acorns, and some seeds. This species forages on foliage, twigs, branches, trunks, and occasionally on the ground, sometimes hanging upside down to forage, and hammering seeds against branches to open them. Oak titmice are attracted to feeders with suet, peanut butter, and sunflower seeds.

== Reproduction and nesting ==
The oak titmouse builds its nest in a woodpecker hole, a natural cavity, or a nest box, using grass, moss, mud, hair, feathers, and fur. Their role in nesting differs slightly:, the female builds the nest over 4 to 10 days, and males often accompany her, and bring her food during the nesting process. They breed from March into July, with peak activity in April and May, laying 3–9 eggs, usually 6–8. The female is the primary incubator, with incubation taking 14–16 days. Young are altricial and are tended by both parents in nest for 16–21 days. Parents continue to tend to young for another three to four weeks after they leave the nest.

Researchers in central California had found that oak titmice sometimes compete for nesting holes with other birds. For example, western bluebird and house wrens. Sometimes their nests even get taken over by European starlings (an invasive species). And because of these nesting competitions, oak titmice usually form pairs early and often stay together for life, defending the same territory throughout the year.

Nevertheless, according to Stanford University and USGS’s research, the Oak Titmouse’s breeding time has been recently shown delayed around 20 days per decade due to the rising temperatures. Therefore, such alternation led to its reduced resiliency in reacting to such a series of climate change.

== Sounds ==
The song of the oak titmouse is a series of repeated phrases of two or three notes with the last note of lower pitch; usually, three to seven phrases are grouped together. Vocal behavior differs between males and females for oak titmouse. Males sing more often in spring, when breeding season is coming,usually from open branches, and they may use a few slightly different sound types made up of clearer, sharper notes in steady rhythm. Females do so too, but they do it less often. And the call is a scratchy tsicka-dee-dee.

The oak titmouse and juniper titmouse appear almost identical, but differ in voice as well as range. The oak titmouse has a browner back than the juniper titmouse. The oak titmouse gives a repeated series of three to seven syllables, each comprising one low and one high note, while the juniper titmouse song consists of a series of rapid syllables on the same note. Ranges overlap only in a small area in California. The tufted titmouse, which does not overlap in range, has a whiter belly, rusty flanks, and black on the forehead.
