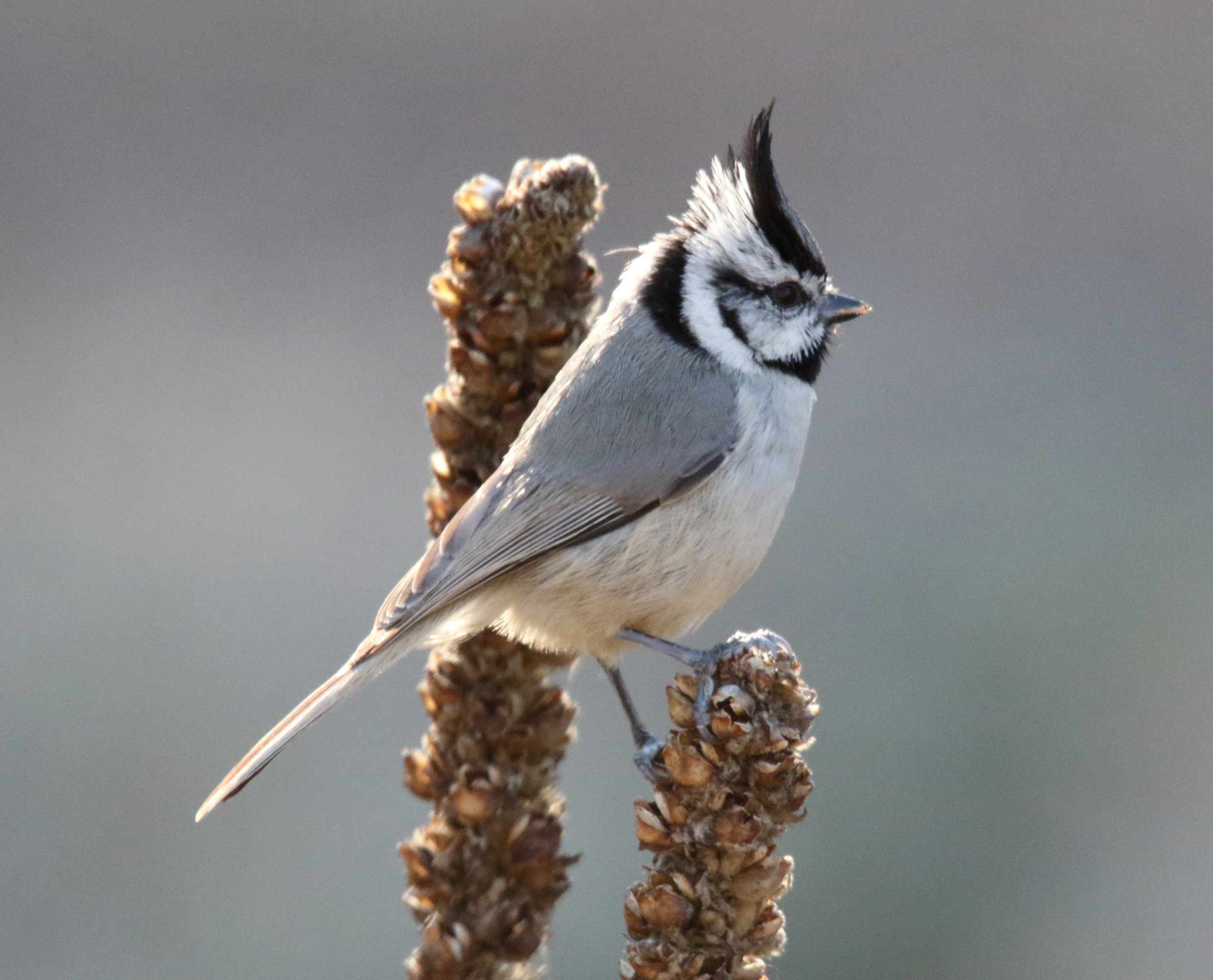

Conservation status
- Least Concern (IUCN 3.1)

Scientific classification
- Kingdom: Animalia
- Phylum: Chordata
- Class: Aves
- Order: Passeriformes
- Family: Paridae
- Genus: Baeolophus
- Species: B. wollweberi

Binomial name
- Baeolophus wollweberi (Bonaparte, 1850)
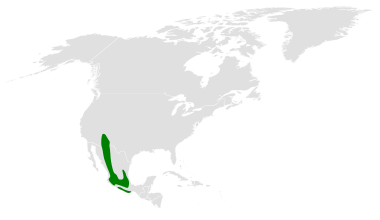
- Range of Baeolophus wollweberi

= Bridled titmouse =

Species of bird

The bridled titmouse (Baeolophus wollweberi) is a small passerine bird in the family Paridae, the tits and chickadees. It is found in Mexico and the United States.

== Taxonomy and systematics ==
The bridled titmouse was originally described in 1850 as Lophanes wollweberi. It was later reassigned to its present genus Baeolophus that was erected in 1851.

The bridled titmouse has these four subspecies:

- B. w. vandevenderi (Rea, 1986)
- B. w. phillipsi ([Van Rossem, 1947)
- B. w. wollweberi (Bonaparte, 1850)
- B. w. caliginosus (Van Rossem, 1947)

== Description ==
The bridled titmouse is about 10 cm (3.9 in) long and weighs about 10 g (0.35 oz). It is a small bird with a distinct crest. The sexes have the same plumage. Adults of the nominate subspecies B. w. wollweberi have a black crown and crest with a large deep gray central patch. They have a black line through the eye that continues as an arc behind the ear coverts on an otherwise white face. The sides of their neck are white. Their chin and throat are black and just connect to the base of the black arc. Their upperparts, wings, and tail are deep olive gray with a thin black line separating the hindneck and upper back; the olive gray becomes more olive to the rear. Their breast is pale olive gray that becomes pale olive buffy on the belly and undertail coverts. They have a dark brown iris, a black bill, and bluish gray legs and feet. Juveniles have a grayish throat and a paler iris than adults.

Subspecies B. w. vandevenderi has a grayish green rump, a wide wash of smoke gray across the breast and flanks, and a whiter belly than the nominate. B. w. phillipsi has a greenish yellow rump, a paler breast with less gray than vandevenderi, and a yellow wash on the belly. B. w. caliginosus is darker and has more olive upperparts than the nominate. The black stripes on its face are wider than the nominate's.

== Distribution and habitat ==
The bridled titmouse has a disjunct distribution; the range of the southernmost subspecies B. w. caliginosus is not contiguous with the others'. The subspecies are found thus:

- B. w. vandevenderi: mountains of central Arizona north of the Gila River and south and southeast along the Mogollon Rim to southwestern New Mexico
- B. w. phillipsi: mountains of southeastern Arizona south of the Gila River and south into western Chihuahua and southern Sonora in northern Mexico
- B. w. wollweberi: western Mexico from Sinaloa and western Durango south to Jalisco and Michoacán; central Mexico from Colima and southern Jalisco east to Puebla and western Veracruz; eastern Mexico from central Nuevo León and western Tamaulipas south to west-central Veracruz
- B. w. caliginosus: southwestern Mexico's Sierra Madre del Sur in Guerrero and Oaxaca

The species has also occurred as a vagrant in southwestern Arizona.

In the U. S. the bridled titmouse primarily inhabits oak and oak-pine-juniper woodlands, and is also found in riparian woods. In Mexico it inhabits oak and pine-oak woodlands and further south adds oak savanna to its habitat. In elevation it generally ranges from 1,200 to 2,700 m (3,900 to 8,900 ft). In southeastern Arizona it typically is found from 1,600 to 2,200 m (5,200 to 7,200 ft) and in southern Mexico occurs as low as 300 m (1,000 ft).

== Behavior ==
=== Movement ===
The bridled titmouse is almost entirely a year-round resident. In the U. S. and northern Mexico it makes some movement to lower elevations in winter.

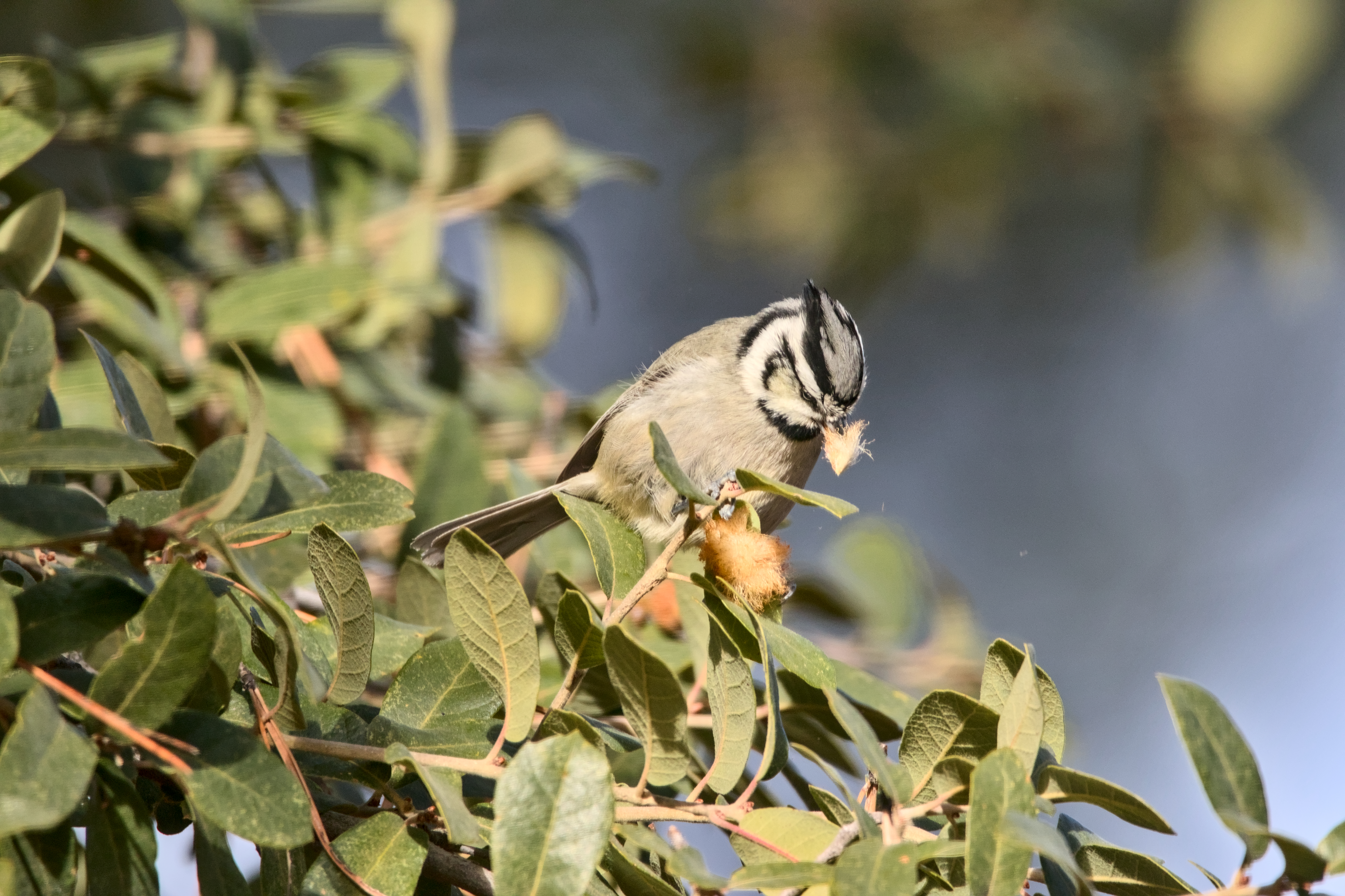
Bridled titmouse eating an oak gall

=== Feeding ===
The bridled titmouse feeds mostly on adult and larval insects, and especially in winter adds acorn pulp to its diet. It takes insects by gleaning from foliage, trunks, and twigs, from within acorns and galls, and occasionally during a brief hover. It winter it commonly forages in mixed-species feeding flocks with warblers, kinglets, vireos, nuthatches, and wrens. It is not known to store food.

=== Breeding ===
The bridled titmouse breeds between mid-April and late July. Pairs typically form each spring. It nests in cavities both natural and human-made such as nest boxes. It does not excavate a cavity but may remove loose material from it. Within the cavity the nest is a cup made from a wide variety of plant materials. Often the first layer is juniper foliage; the last layer is soft material such as plant down, rabbit fur, and flowers. Nests have been recorded between about 0.5 and 10 m (2 and 33 ft) above the ground. The clutch is typically five to seven plain white eggs though smaller ones are not uncommon. Females alone incubate the clutch, for an estimated 13 to 14 days. Males feed females during incubation. Fledging occurs about 18 to 20 days after hatch. Both sexes apparently brood nestlings and both provision them. The species is unusual among Paridae in that some pairs have a third individual associated with them which helps with provisioning nestlings and in nest defense.

=== Vocalization ===
The bridled titmouse has three types of song; they are variations on a "peeta-peeta" theme and variously are used in territorial defense and mate attraction. For U. S. birds the song is described as "a rapid series of six to eight low, clear, whistled phrases with [a] popping quality pidi pidi pidi pidi pidi pidi". It also has three main call types, in the U. S. described as "a rapid sequence of low harsh notes in [a] chickadee-like chatter". In addition, the species has an array of alarm, agonistic, begging, and other calls.

== Status ==
The IUCN has assessed the bridled titmouse as being of Least Concern. It has a very large range; its estimated population of 460,000 mature individuals is believed to be decreasing. No immediate threats have been identified. It is considered common in the U. S. However, in Mexico its populations are "fragmented and local" especially in the southern part of its range. "Overexploitation and destruction of oak woodlands has played key role in extirpation of Bridled Titmouse at some sites."
