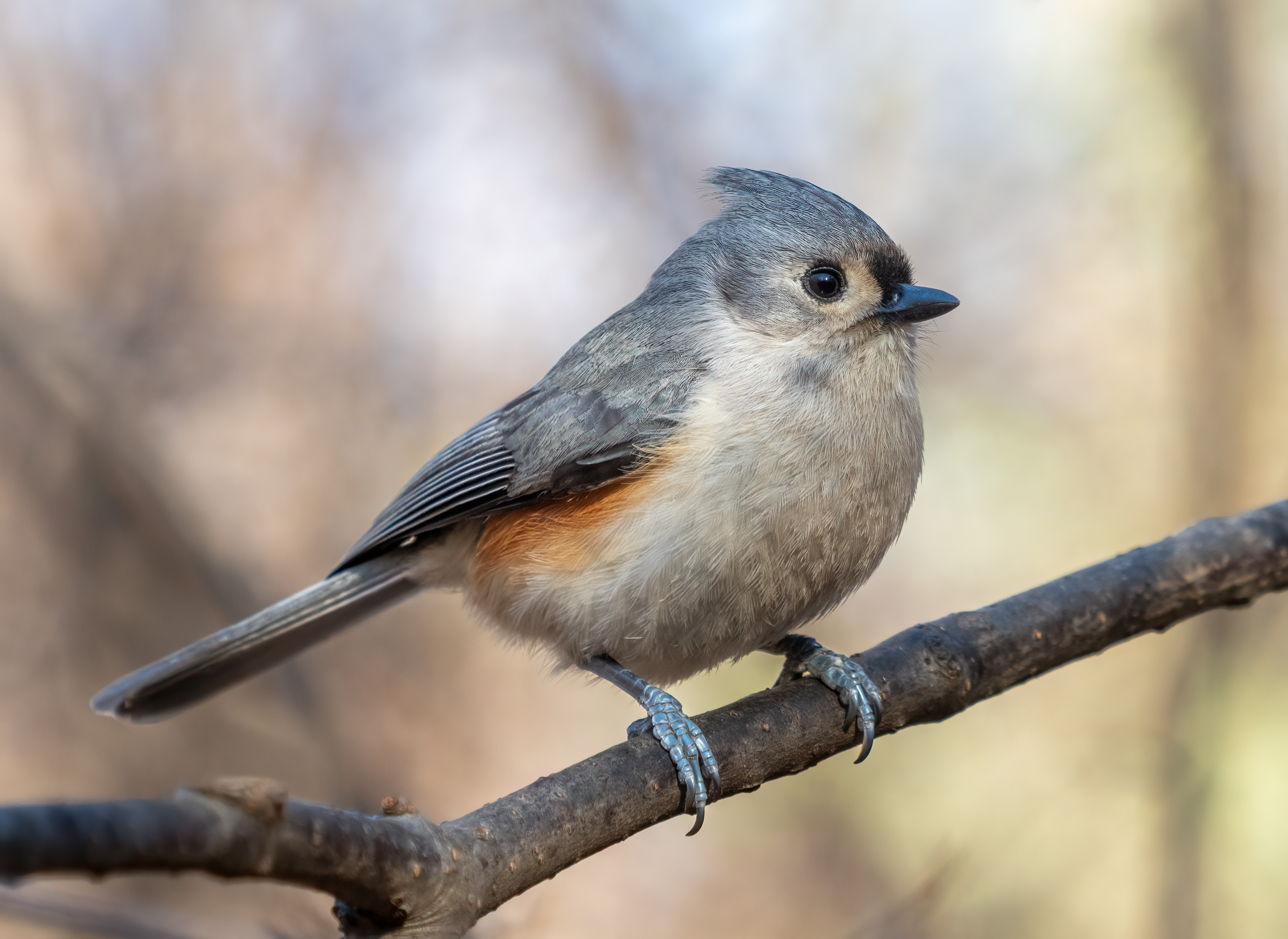
- Tufted titmouse

Conservation status
- Least Concern (IUCN 3.1)

Scientific classification
- Kingdom: Animalia
- Phylum: Chordata
- Class: Aves
- Order: Passeriformes
- Family: Paridae
- Genus: Baeolophus
- Species: B. bicolor

Binomial name
- Baeolophus bicolor (Linnaeus, 1766)
- Approximate distribution map Year-round

Synonyms
- Parus bicolor Linnaeus, 1766

Audio
- Call

= Tufted titmouse =

Species of bird native to North America

The tufted titmouse (Baeolophus bicolor) is a small songbird native to eastern North America. The species belongs to the tit and chickadee family (Paridae). The black-crested titmouse, found from central and southern Texas southward, was originally included as a subspecies but now is considered a separate species, Baeolophus atricristatus.

== Description ==
Measurements:

- Length: 14–16 cm (5.5–6.3 in)
- Weight: 18–26 g (0.63–0.92 oz)
- Wingspan: 20–26 cm (7.9–10.2 in)

A small bird, the tufted titmouse has a white front and gray upper body outlined with rust-colored flanks. Other characteristics include its black forehead and the tufted gray crest on its head. In juveniles, the black forehead is greatly diminished such that it may be confused with the oak titmouse, although their ranges do not overlap. Males tend to be larger than females.

The song of the tufted titmouse is usually described as a whistled peter-peter-peter, although this song can vary in about 20 notable ways.

== Distribution and habitat ==
The habitat of the tufted titmouse is deciduous and mixed woods, gardens, parks, and shrublands. Although it is nonmigratory and originally native to the Ohio and Mississippi River basins, factors such as bird feeders have caused it to occupy a larger territory across the United States and stretching into Ontario and Quebec in Canada. During the second half of the 20th century and into the 21st century, the species' range has been expanding northwards.

== Behavior and ecology ==
The tufted titmouse gathers food from the ground and from tree branches, frequently consuming a variety of berries, nuts, seeds, small fruits, and insects and other invertebrates. Caterpillars constitute a major part of its diet during the summer. This species is also a regular visitor to bird feeders. Its normal pattern is to scout a feeder from cover, fly in to take a seed, then fly back to shelter to consume the morsel, though caching is also very common.

The tufted titmouse is vocally active and responds to sounds of agitation in other birds. This species readily forms small flocks, known as troupes or banditries, which often associate with chickadees and other passerines when foraging.

=== Breeding and nesting ===
Tufted titmice nest in a hole in a tree, either a natural cavity, a human-made nest box, or sometimes an old woodpecker nest.They line the nest with soft materials, sometimes plucking hair from live mammals to use as material, a behavior known as kleptotrichy. If they find snakeskin sheddings, they may incorporate pieces into their nest. Eggs measure under 1 inch (2.5 centimetres) long and are white or cream-colored with brownish or purplish spots. Eggs have an incubation period of 12–14 days; titmice then remain nestlings for 15–16 days.

The lifespan of the tufted titmouse is roughly 2.1 years, although it can live for more than 10 years. Average clutch size is five to seven eggs. Unlike many birds, the offspring of tufted titmice often stay with their parents during the winter and even after the first year of their lives. Sometimes, a bird born the year before helps its parents raise the next year's young.

The tufted titmouse occasionally hybridizes with the black-crested titmouse; the hybridization range is very narrow, however, because of genetic differences.

=== Diet ===
Annually, nearly two-thirds of the tufted titmouse diet consists of insects. During the summer, caterpillars are an essential part of their diet. With respect to nuts and seeds, the tufted titmouse primarily prefers sunflower seeds and consumes suet and peanuts, as well. During the fall and winter, the tufted titmouse hoards food. When visiting a feeder, they take one seed per visit and store seeds within 130 feet of the feeder.

== Status ==
From 1966 to 2015, the tufted titmouse population has increased by more than 1.5% per year throughout the northeastern United States. The current breeding population is estimated to be around 8 million. Since 1988, the tufted titmouse has been assessed for the IUCN Red List, and has always been placed in the Least Concern (or equivalent) (Note: IUCN2.3 used "Low Risk/least concern", while the assessments from 2004 and on used IUCN3.1's "Least Concern") ranking.

== Gallery ==
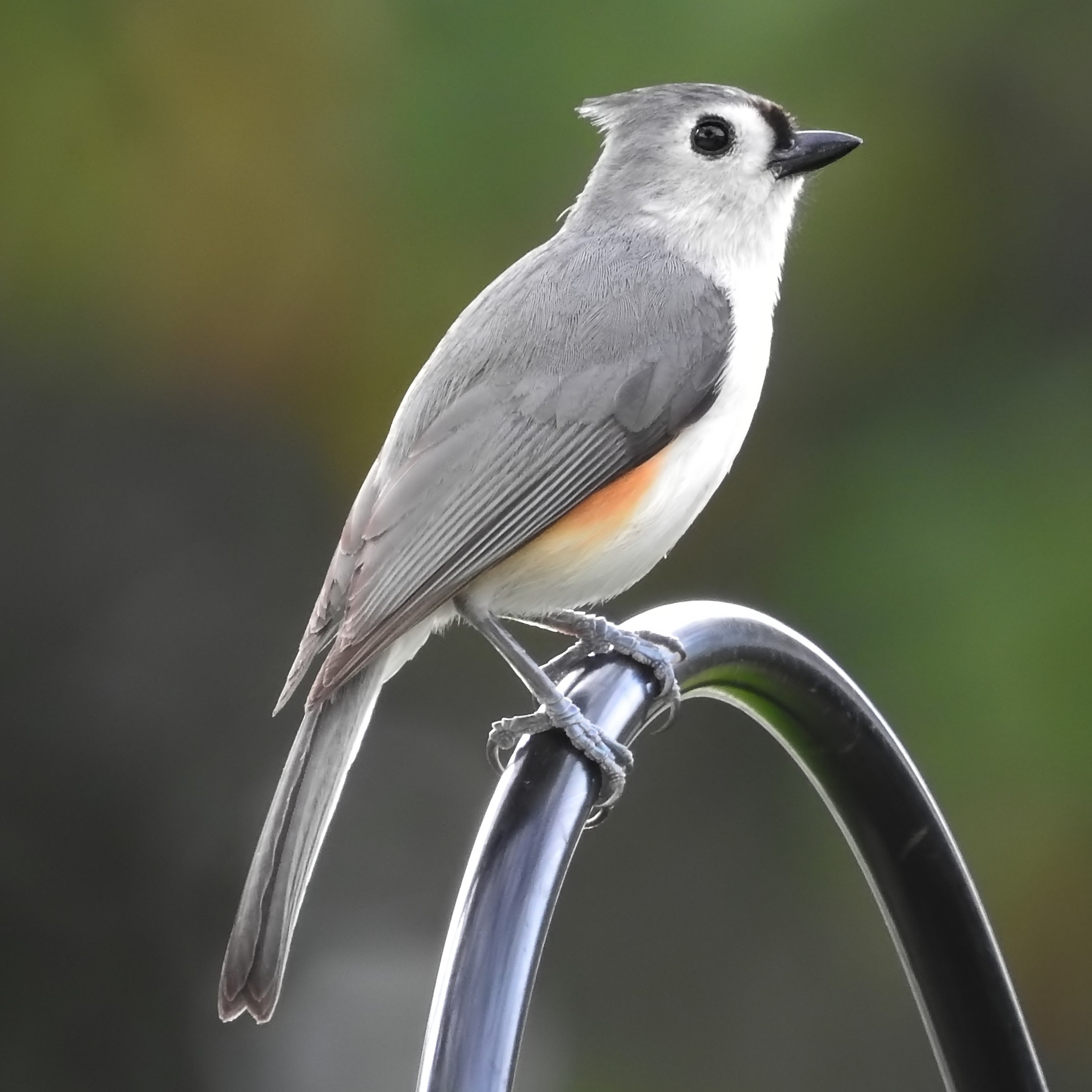
At a bird feeder

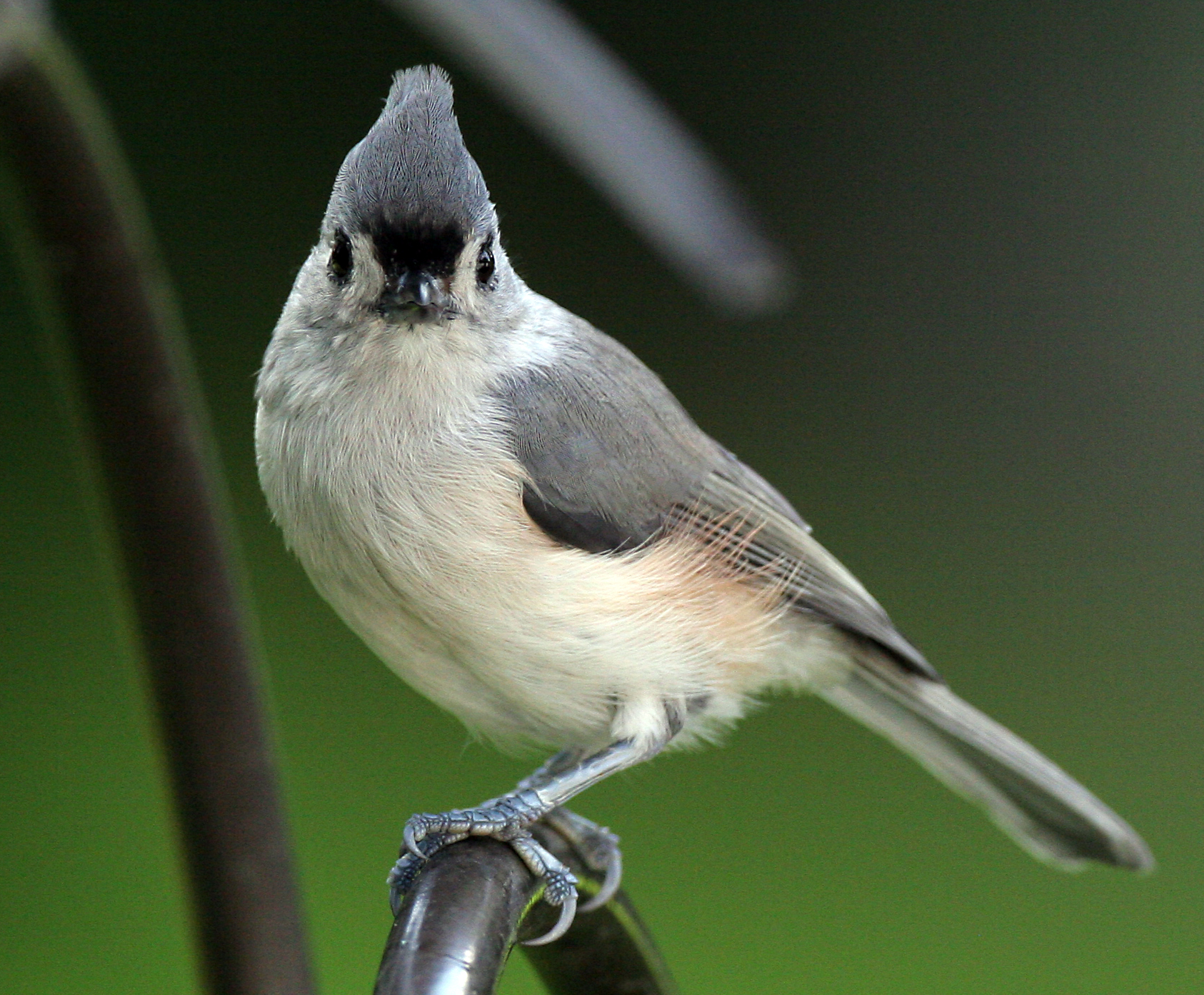
Facing forward

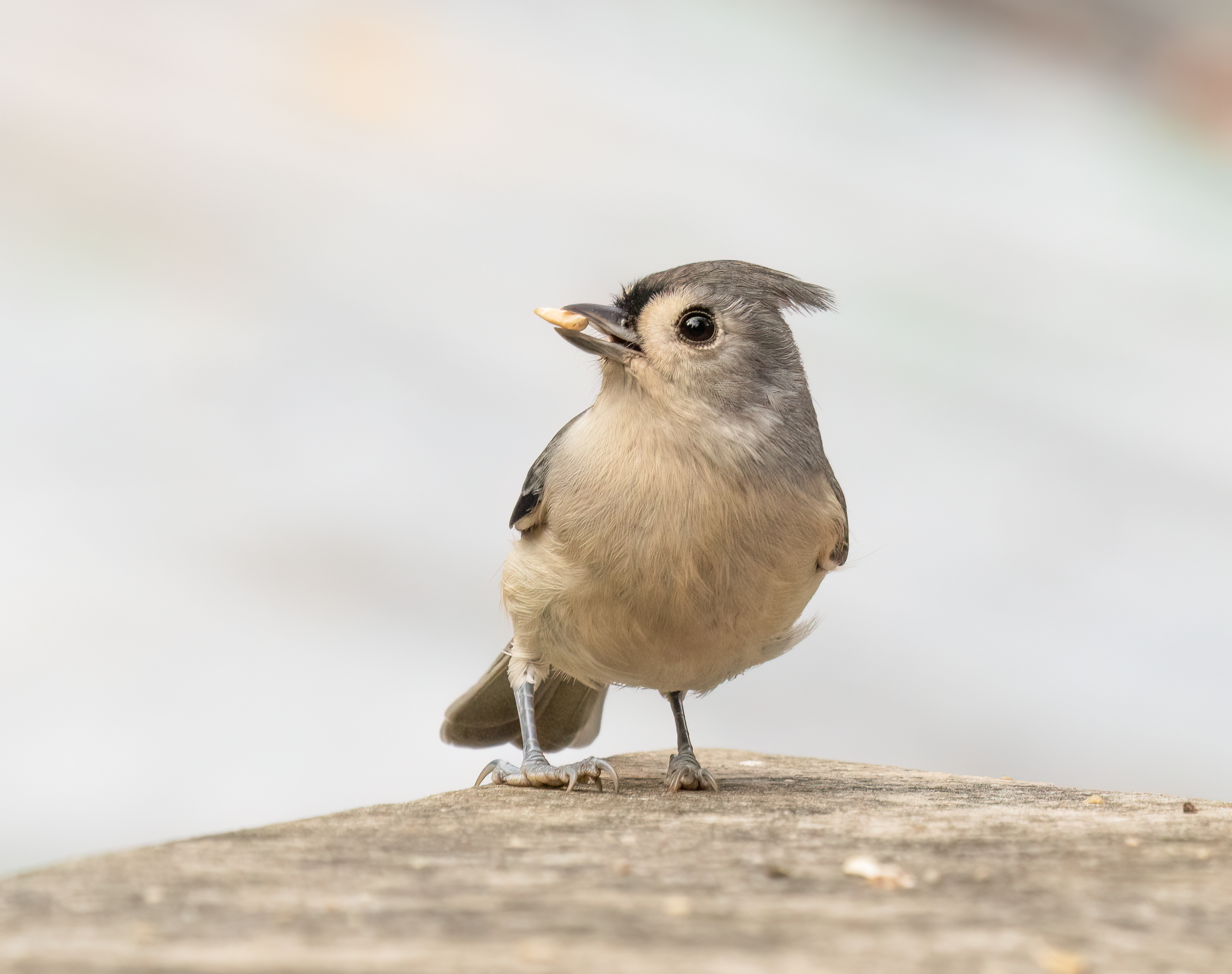
With a seed

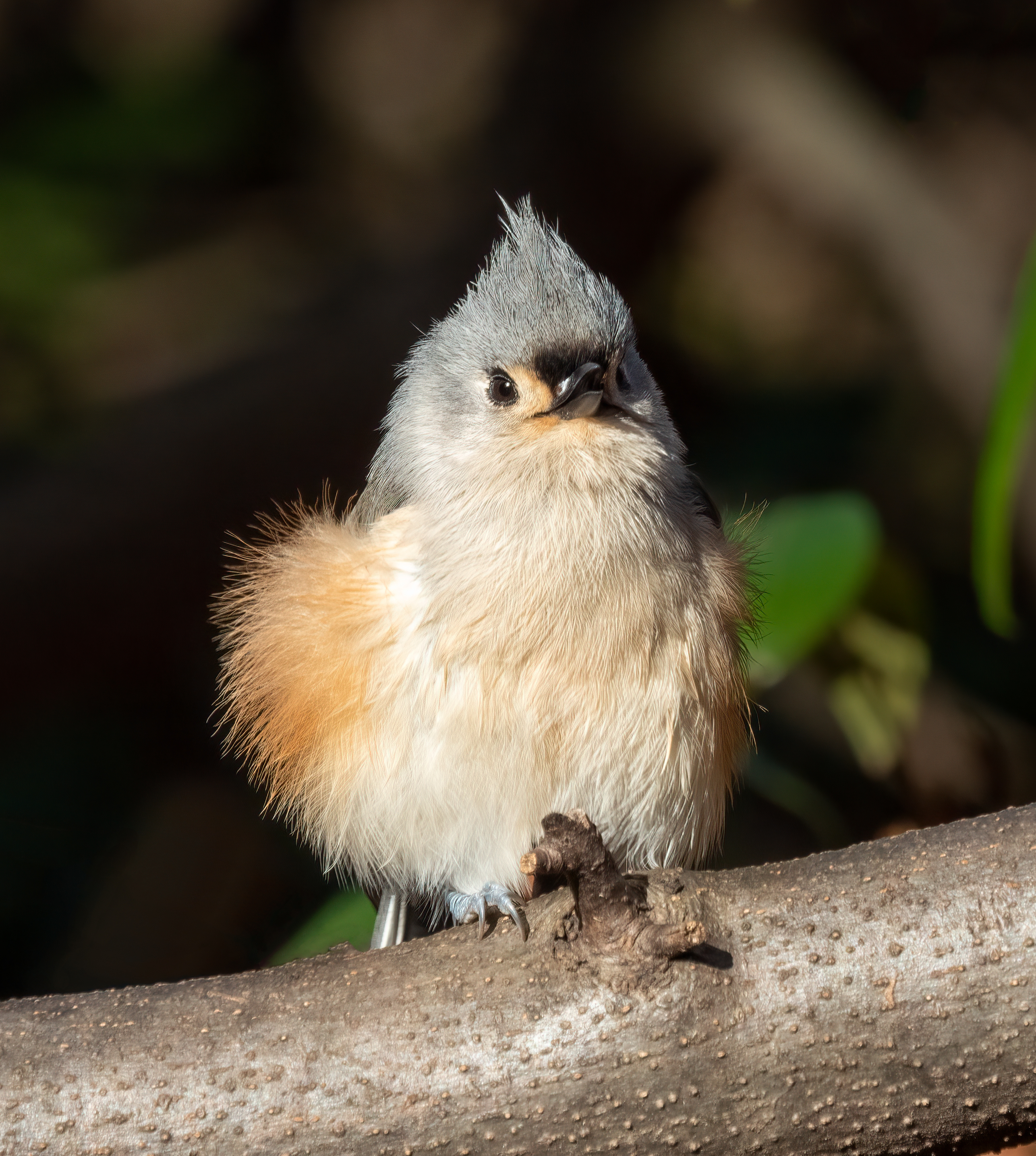
Fluffed up while preening

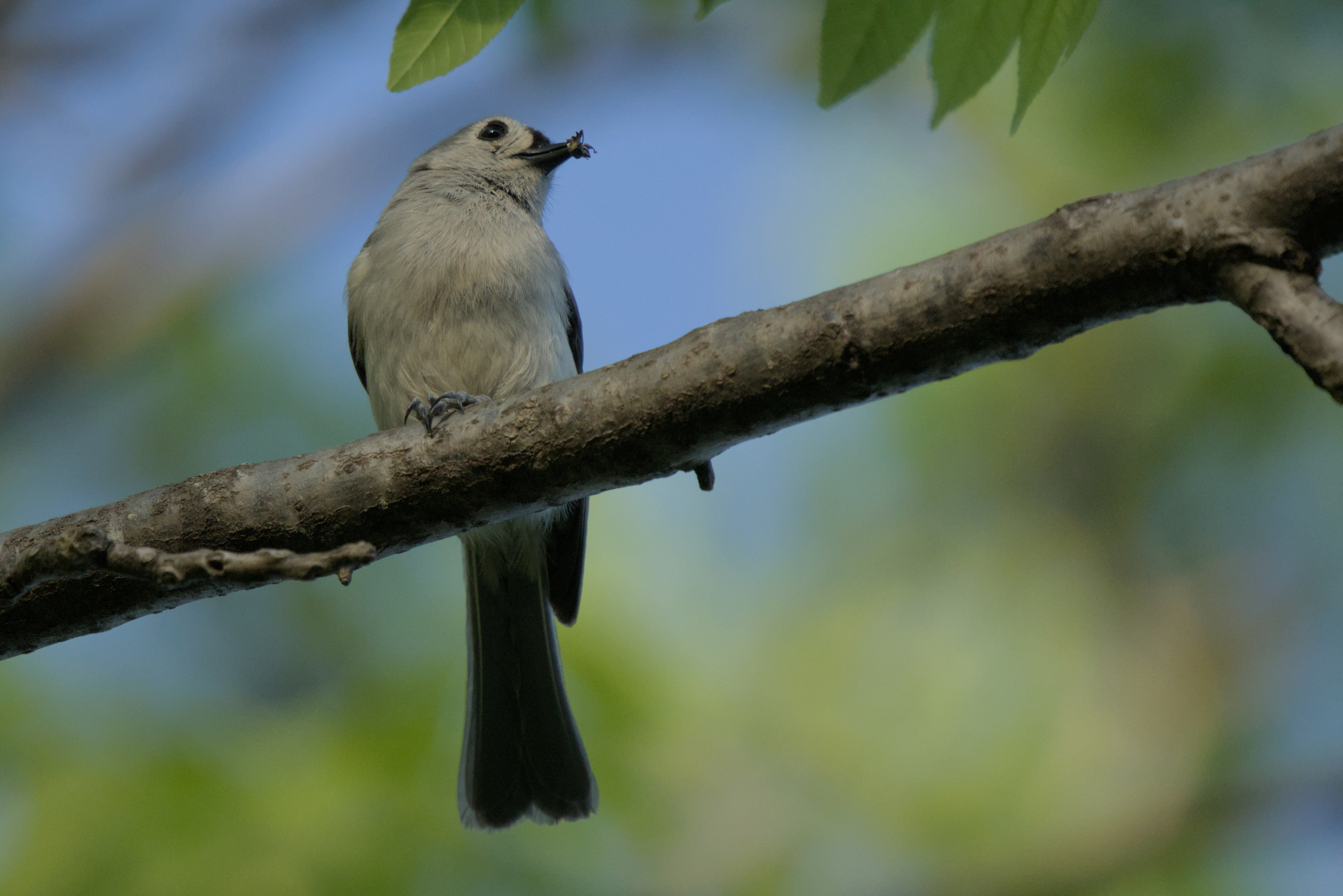
With insect in beak
