= Lists of endemic birds =

This is a master list pertaining to lists of endemic birds. As applied to birds, the term "endemic" refers to any species found only within a defined geographical area. There is no upper limit for the area; it would not be incorrect to refer to all bird species as endemic to Earth. In practice, the largest areas for which the term is in common use are countries and geographical regions. An Endemic Bird Area (EBA), a term devised by BirdLife International, is a geographical (rather than political) region of the world that contains two or more restricted-range (of no more than 50,000 km^{2}) species, while a "secondary area" contains one restricted-range species.

== Endemic birds ==
Palearctic

- Endemic birds of the Western Palearctic
- Endemic birds of Japan

Afrotropical

- Endemic birds of southern Africa
- Endemic birds of Madagascar and western Indian Ocean islands

Indomalayan

- Endemic birds of the Indian Subcontinent
- Endemic birds of the Andaman and Nicobar Islands
- Endemic birds of the Himalayas
- Endemic birds of Borneo
- Endemic birds of Sulawesi
- Endemic birds of the Philippines
- Endemic birds of Taiwan
- Endemic birds of Sri Lanka

Australasia

- Endemic birds of Australia
- Endemic birds of New Zealand
- Endemic birds of New Caledonia

Oceania

- Endemic birds of Hawaii

Nearctic

- Endemic birds of eastern North America
- Endemic birds of western North America
- Endemic birds of the West Indies
- Endemic birds of Mexico and northern Central America

Neotropical

- Endemic birds of the Galápagos Islands
- Endemic birds of Colombia

== Endemic bird areas ==
- List of endemic bird areas of the world
- List of secondary endemic bird areas of the world

== See also ==
- Endemic Bird Area
- Important Bird Area
