= Endemic Bird Areas of the World =

1998 non-fiction book

Endemic Bird Areas of the World: Priorities for Biodiversity Conservation
- Author: Alison J. Stattersfield, Michael J. Crosby, Adrian J. Long, and David C. Wege
- Language: English
- Series: BirdLife Conservation Series
- Publisher: Birdlife International
- Publication date: 1998
- Publication place: United Kingdom
- Media type: Print (Softback)
- Pages: 846
- ISBN: 0-946888-33-7
- OCLC: 39180924
- Text: Endemic Bird Areas of the World: Priorities for Biodiversity Conservation at Internet Archive

Endemic Bird Areas of the World: Priorities for Biodiversity Conservation represents an effort to systematically identify Endemic Bird Areas and assess and prioritize their importance for global biodiversity conservation.

The authors are Alison J. Stattersfield, Michael J. Crosby, Adrian J. Long, and David C. Wege, with a foreword by Queen Noor of Jordan. Endemic Bird Areas of the World: Priorities for Biodiversity Conservation contains 846 pages, and is a 1998 publication by Birdlife International, No. 7 in their BirdLife Conservation Series.

== Six Introductory Sections ==
The book has six introductory sections:

- "Biodiversity and Priority setting"
- "Identifying Endemic Bird Areas"
- "Global Analyses"
- "The Prioritization of Endemic Bird Areas"
- "The Conservation Relevance of Endemic Bird Areas"
- "Endemic Bird Areas as Targets for Conservation Action"

== Six Regional Introductions ==
These are then followed by six Regional Introductions, in which Endemic Bird Areas are grouped into six major regions:

- North and Central America
- South America
- Africa, Europe, and the Middle East
- Continental Asia
- South-east Asian Islands, New Guinea and Australia
- Pacific Islands

== Endemic Bird Areas ==
The bulk of the book consists of accounts of each of the 218 Endemic Bird Areas. Each account contains the following information:

- summary statistics about the EBA
- A "General Characteristics" section
- A section giving an overview of the restricted-range endemic bird species found in the EBA
- A Threats and Conservation section describing the threats posed to the EBA's biodiversity interest, and any significant measure in which are in place to counter these
- An annotated list of the restricted-range endemics found in the EBA

== Secondary Bird Areas ==
The book concludes with a short section giving brief details of 138 secondary areas, again grouped into the six regions.

== Details ==
Endemic Bird Areas of the World: Priorities for Biodiversity Conservation follows on from work presented in the 1992 publication Putting biodiversity on the map: priority areas for global conservation.

== See also ==
- Endemic Bird Area
  - List of endemic bird areas of the world
  - List of secondary endemic bird areas of the world
- List of birds
  - Lists of endemic birds
  - Lists of birds by region
- Category: Lists of endemic birds by region
- Category: Lists of birds
- Endemism
- Biodiversity
