= List of endemic birds of Mexico and northern Central America =

Birds with ranges of only Mexico or Central America

This article is one of a series providing information about endemism among birds in the world's various zoogeographic zones. For an overview of this subject see Endemism in birds.

== Patterns of endemism ==
=== Genus-level endemism ===
No bird families are endemic to the region; however, the following genera are endemic:

In addition in the following genera, high proportions of the member species are endemic to the region:

== Endemic Bird Areas ==
Birdlife International has defined a number of Endemic Bird Areas and Secondary Areas in this region.

== List of species ==
The following is a list of bird species endemic to the region of Mexico south to Nicaragua (M indicates a species endemic to Mexico; G, Guatemala).

- M Rufous-bellied chachalaca
- M West Mexican chachalaca
- Highland guan
- M,G Horned guan EN
- M Bearded wood-partridge
- M Long-tailed wood-partridge
- M Elegant quail
- M Banded quail
- Black-throated bobwhite
- Singing quail
- Ocellated quail
- Ocellated turkey
- M Aztec rail
- M Tuxtla quail-dove
- White-faced quail-dove
- M Socorro dove
- Lesser roadrunner
- M Balsas screech-owl
- M,G Bearded screech-owl
- M Tamaulipas pygmy-owl
- M Colima pygmy-owl
- Fulvous owl
- M Eared poorwill
- M Tawny-collared nightjar
- Yucatan nightjar
- M White-fronted swift
- M White-naped swift
- M Short-crested coquette
- Green-throated mountain-gem
- Green-breasted mountain-gem
- Amethyst-throated hummingbird
- Garnet-throated hummingbird
- Slender sheartail
- M Mexican sheartail
- Sparkling-tailed hummingbird
- M Beautiful hummingbird
- M Bumblebee hummingbird
- Wine-throated hummingbird
- M Golden-crowned emerald
- M Cozumel emerald
- M Dusky hummingbird
- Emerald-chinned hummingbird
- Wedge-tailed sabrewing
- M Long-tailed sabrewing
- Rufous sabrewing
- M Mexican woodnymph
- M Blue-capped hummingbird
- M White-tailed hummingbird
- White-bellied emerald
- Honduran emerald
- Azure-crowned hummingbird
- Berylline hummingbird
- M Green-fronted hummingbird
- M Xantus's hummingbird
- M Citreoline trogon
- Mountain trogon
- Blue-throated motmot
- M,G Russet-crowned motmot
- M Golden-cheeked woodpecker
- M Gray-breasted woodpecker
- Yucatan woodpecker
- M Strickland's woodpecker
- M Gray-crowned woodpecker
- M Red-crowned parrot
- M Lilac-crowned parrot
- Yellow-naped parrot
- Yellow-headed parrot
- Yellow-lored parrot
- M Mexican parrotlet
- M Thick-billed parrot
- M Maroon-fronted parrot
- M Green parakeet
- Pacific parakeet
- M Rose-bellied bunting
- M Cozumel thrasher
- M Cozumel vireo
- M Sinaloa crow
- Tamaulipas crow
- Belted flycatcher
- M Pileated flycatcher
- Crimson-collared grosbeak
- Bushy-crested jay
- M Dwarf jay
- M Purplish-backed jay
- M San Blas jay
- M Tufted jay
- M White-throated jay
- M Guadalupe junco
- Blue-and-white mockingbird
- M Socorro mockingbird CR
- Bar-winged oriole
- Rufous-collared robin
- M, G Black-capped siskin
- M Socorro wren
- M Black-chested sparrow
- M Bridled sparrow
- M Cinnamon-tailed sparrow
- M Worthen's sparrow
- M Oaxaca sparrow
- M Sierra Madre sparrow
- Black-capped swallow
- Green-striped brush finch
- M Guerrero brush finch
- M, G Azure-rumped tanager
- M Rufous-backed robin
- M White-throated towhee
- Yucatán vireo
- M,G Pink-headed warbler
- M,G Giant wren
- M Gray-barred wren
- M Nava's wren
- Rufous-browed wren
- M Yucatán wren
- M Altamira yellowthroat
- M Belding's yellowthroat
- M Black-polled yellowthroat

The following is a list of species endemic to the region as breeding species:

- Black-vented shearwater
- Least storm-petrel
- Guadalupe murrelet
- Craveri's murrelet

The following is a list of species endemic to the region as non-breeding species:

The following restricted-range species are also found in the region:

- Colima warbler

The following are species which are near-endemics that also occur in the southwestern United States:

- Plain chachalaca
- Montezuma quail
- Black storm-petrel
- Ridgway's rail
- Scripps's murrelet
- Whiskered screech-owl
- Elf owl
- Buff-collared nightjar
- Mexican whip-poor-will
- Blue-throated hummingbird
- Lucifer hummingbird
- Broad-billed hummingbird
- Buff-bellied hummingbird
- Violet-crowned hummingbird
- Eared quetzal
- Gila woodpecker
- Golden-fronted woodpecker
- Ladder-backed woodpecker
- Arizona woodpecker
- Gilded flicker

The following are species which are near-endemics that also occur south to Costa Rica:

- Thicket tinamou
- Slaty-breasted tinamou
- White-bellied chachalaca
- Buffy-crowned wood-partridge
- Buffy-crowned wood-partridge
- Ruddy crake
- Lesser ground-cuckoo
- Pacific screech-owl
- Great swallow-tailed swift
- Black-crested coquette
- Plain-capped starthroat
- Canivet's emerald
- Blue-tailed hummingbird
- Cinnamon hummingbird
- Black-headed trogon
- Keel-billed motmot
- Turquoise-browed motmot
- Hoffmann's woodpecker
- White-fronted parrot
- Orange-fronted parakeet

The following extinct species were formerly endemic:

- G Atitlan grebe (last reported 1986)
- Guadalupe storm-petrel
- M Imperial woodpecker
- M Guadalupe caracara (last reported 1990)
- M Slender-billed Grackle
