= List of endemic birds of Borneo =

Birds endemic to the island of Borneo

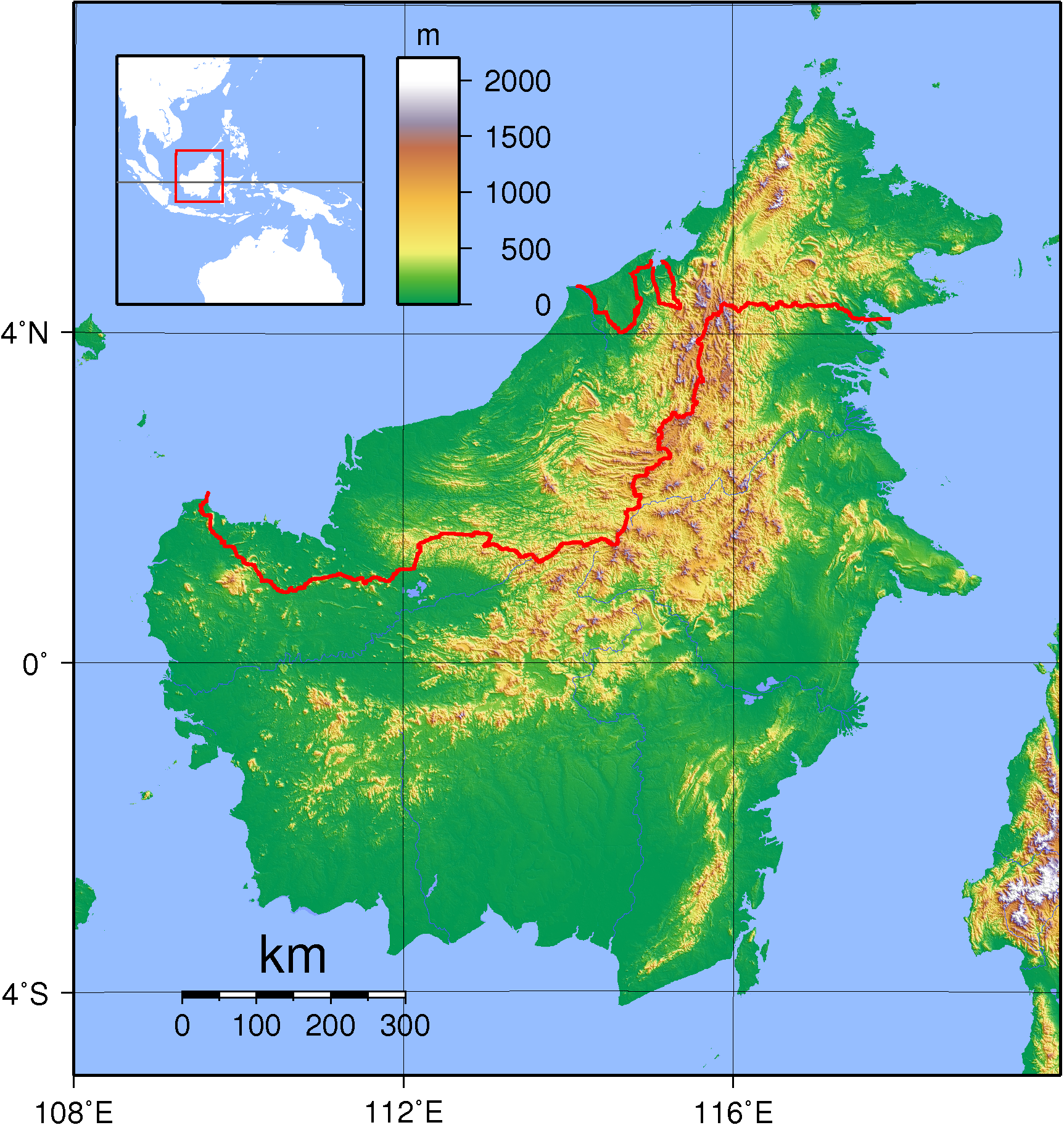
Map of Borneo, showing the island's topography

The island of Borneo, located in southeast Asia at the southern edge of the South China Sea, is home to one endemic bird family, three endemic bird genera and 61 endemic bird species. All but one of the latter are forest dwellers, with most restricted to the spine of hills and mountains running down the middle of the island. The avian endemism has been shaped by the island's geological history. Borneo sits on a continental shelf. During glacial periods, when water levels were lower, Borneo was linked with other islands on the shelf and with the Malay Peninsula in a large landmass known as Sundaland. This allowed bird species to move freely throughout the region until the waters rose again as the glaciers melted. Separated from their relatives by the sea, some of these species evolved over millennia into the endemics now found on the island. BirdLife International has designated the mountainous central spine of the island as an Endemic Bird Area (EBA) because of the number of endemic species found there, and has further designated several lowland regions and nearby islands as secondary EBAs. Habitat destruction is a major threat to Borneo's endemic birds, as forests are lost to palm oil plantations and timber harvesting.

== Geology and geological history ==
Borneo is an island located in southeast Asia, on the continental shelf at the southern edge of the South China Sea. It lies south of the Philippines, west of Sulawesi, north of Java, and east of Peninsular Malaysia. With an area of 748,168 km^{2} (288,869 mi^{2}), it is the world's third largest island. More than half of the island is lowlands, rising to less than 150 m (490 ft). However, a spine of mountains runs down much of the central portion of the island. These include Mount Kinabalu, which at 4,095 m (13,435 ft) is the tallest mountain between the Himalayas and West Papua. The island is shared by three countries: Indonesia, Malaysia, and Brunei. While the lowlands are the most productive habitat in terms of the number of bird species found there, the mountains are the seat of Borneo's endemism. This is in large part due to the island's geological history.

During the Pleistocene, the world's polar caps repeatedly advanced and retreated, alternately locking vast amounts of water into ice, and releasing it back into the world's oceans. This caused the water level in the oceans to repeatedly rise and fall. During glacial periods, when water levels were at their lowest, much of the Sunda Shelf was exposed. This linked what are now discrete islands (including Borneo, Java, Sumatra, and a host of smaller islands) with the Malay Peninsula in one large landmass known as Sundaland. During periods when the shelf was exposed, birds could move freely across the whole landmass. When the waters rose again, these birds were cut off from their relatives, and evolved in isolation on the various islands. Temperatures were cooler overall during glacial periods, so montane birds (those generally restricted to the slopes of mountains) could move lower and spread across larger areas. During interglacial periods, they retreated to higher elevations and were separated again from other populations, including birds in the lowlands. Studies have shown that some endemic montane species are most closely related to species in Borneo's lowlands, while others are more closely related to montane species on other Sundaland islands.

== Endemism and threats ==
The island is home to a single endemic family: Pityriaseidae, which contains a single endemic genus (Pityriasis) with a single endemic species, the Bornean bristlehead. In addition, the island holds two other endemic genera, both of which are also monotypic: Chlamydochaera (the fruithunter) and Haematortyx (the crimson-headed partridge). Two other monotypic genera formerly considered to be endemic to the island—Chlorocharis and Oculocincta—have since been merged into more widespread genera. Chlorocharis was merged into the large white-eye genus Zosterops after molecular studies showed it nested comfortably within that genus. The same studies showed that Oculocincta was embedded within the smaller white-eye genus Heleia, leading it to be moved as well.

There are 61 endemic bird species on Borneo, according to the taxonomy proposed by the International Ornithologists' Union. Nearly all of these are forest birds; only the dusky munia is not. In all, roughly 10% of Borneo's forest birds are endemic to the island. Of these, 60% are montane species, 30% are found on lower slopes, and 10% are lowland species. However, Borneo's forests are under threat, particularly in the lowlands. Nearly 40% of the island's forests had been completely cleared by 2016, and another 34% had been selectively logged. Some 80% of Kalimantan's forests have been sold to timber concessions. Much of the original lowland forest has been converted to palm oil plantations; these now cover more than 32% of Kalimantan's lowland area. This results in a huge loss of biodiversity. While the original dipterocarp forests are home to more than 220 bird species, for example, palm plantations support only about 14 resident species. Some 80% of Kalimantan's forests have been opened up to timber concessions, even in protected areas. Many highland forests fall into protected areas—including national parks and forest reserves—but such gazetting does not always guarantee true protection, with logging occurring even in those areas.

== Endemic Bird Areas ==
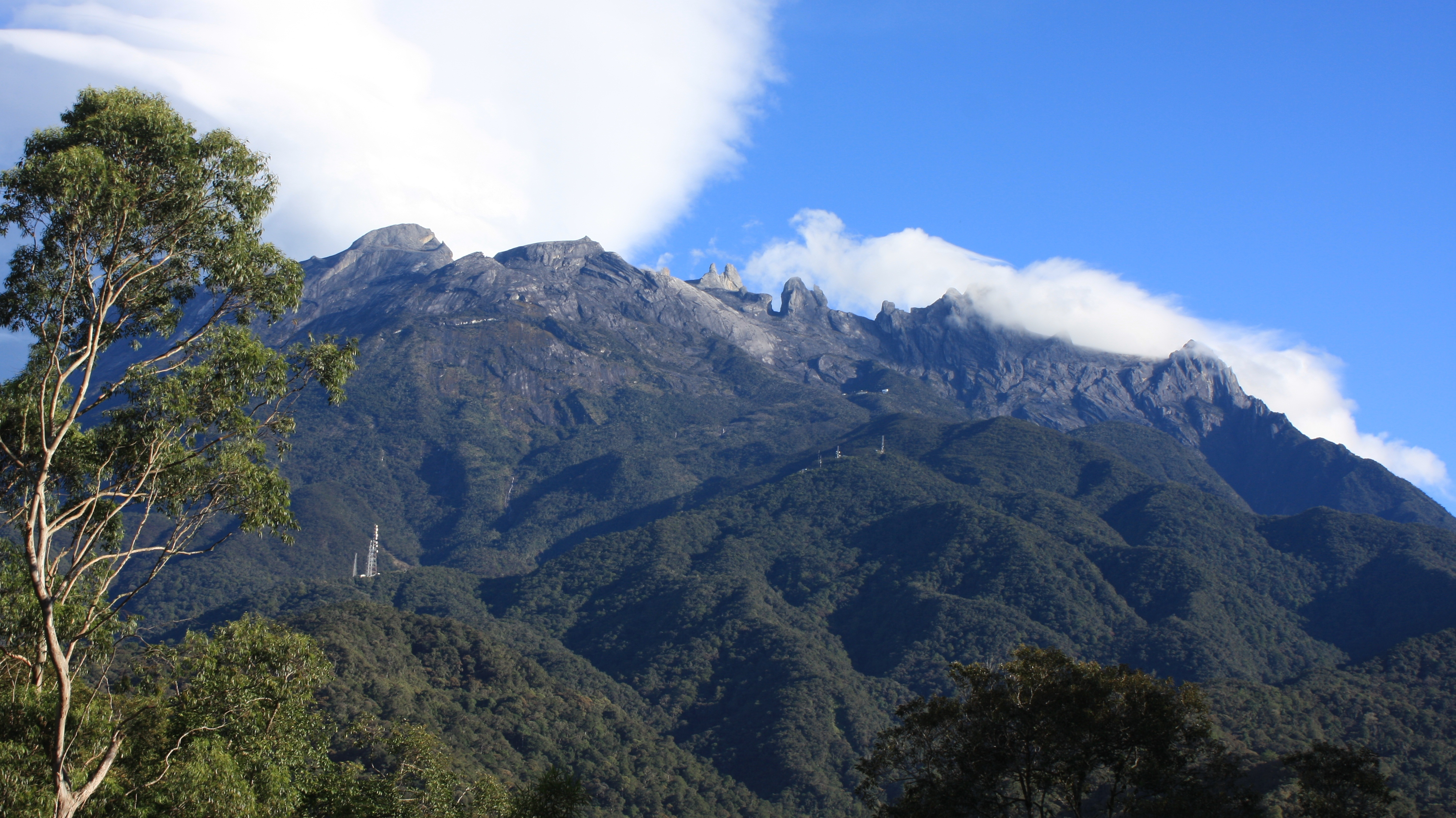
Mount Kinabalu is the tallest of the island's mountains, and the best place to see its montane endemics.

Birdlife International defines Endemic Bird Areas (EBAs) as places where the breeding ranges of two or more range-restricted species—those with breeding ranges of less than 50,000 km^{2} (19,000 sq mi)—overlap. In order to qualify, the whole of the breeding range of at least two range-restricted species must fall entirely within the EBA. Borneo has one such area. The Bornean mountains EBA (157) comprises 130,000 km^{2} (50,000 sq mi) of mountain ranges in Borneo's interior, at an altitude above 500 m (1,600 ft) in elevation. These mountains are found in all three countries which share the island. Two of Borneo's three endemic genera are found here; only the Borneo bristlehead is found at lower elevations. In total, 31 range-restricted species occur within this EBA.

BirdLife International has also designated five Secondary EBAs for Borneo: two smaller island groups and three areas on Borneo itself. Secondary EBAs are those which either include the breeding range of only a single range-restricted species, or those which cover only part of a range-restricted bird's breeding area.

- The North-east Bornean islands secondary area (s097) includes a number of small islands off the northern and eastern coasts of Borneo. The grey imperial pigeon, which the International Union for Conservation of Nature (IUCN) considers to be a vulnerable species, is found on a dozen or so of the islands; the near threatened, range-restricted Mantanani scops owl is more common and widespread on the small islands off Sabah. Both species also breed on small islands near the Philippines. Three designated Important Bird Areas (IBAs) fall within this area.
- The Sabah lowlands secondary area (s098) encompasses the lowlands of the Malaysian state of Sabah, at the northern end of Borneo. The breeding range of the white-fronted falconet, a near-threatened species, falls entirely within the area. Part of the breeding range of the white-crowned shama is also included. The secondary area includes eight designated IBAs.
- The Kalimantan lowlands secondary area (s099) encompasses the lowland forest thought to contain the breeding range of the black-browed babbler, a presumably threatened species rediscovered in 2020, more than 170 years after the only specimen was collected. There are no IBAs in this secondary area.
- The Bornean coastal zone secondary area (s100) includes mangroves, coastal forest, and scrub on the island's western and southern coasts. These lie in the Malaysian state of Sarawak, and the Indonesian provinces of Kalimantan Barat, Kalimantan Selatan and Kalimantan Tengah. Part of the breeding area of the range-restricted Javan white-eye is found here; the vulnerable species also breeds on the Javan coast. The secondary area includes one designated IBA.
- The Natuna Islands secondary area (s101) includes small islands in an archipelago located off the western coast of Borneo. The critically endangered and range-restricted silvery pigeon occurs in very small numbers here; it also occurs on Sumatra and a few smaller islands just off Sumatra's coasts. One designated IBA lies within this zone.

== List of endemic species ==
IUCN Red List categories
Conservation status
- EX: Extinct (0 species)
- EW: Extinct in the wild (0 species)
- CR: Critically endangered (0 species)
- EN: Endangered (1 species)
- VU: Vulnerable (5 species)
- NT: Near threatened (13 species)
- LC: Least concern (37 species)

Other categories
- DD: Data deficient (2 species)
- NE: Not evaluated (2 species)

Endemic species
Taxon. order (Note: This list uses the taxonomy proposed by the International Ornithologists' Union. Avian checklists and field guides typically list species in taxonomic order to show the evolutionary relationships between species; those which are more closely related are physically listed nearer each other.)	Common name	Picture	Scientific name	Habitat	IUCN status (Note: This column sorts by threat level, as outlined in the key above.)	Notes	EBA
1	Hose's partridge	Painting of a round-bodied, large-footed bird with black-striped brown back, gray underparts and rust-coloured head and throat walking on the ground	Rhizothera dulitensis	Hill and lower montane forest	VU^{IUCN}	Also known as Dulit partridge.	
2	Red-breasted partridge	Painting of round-bodied bird with brown back, chestnut head, neck and breast, large white spots on side, and orange legs and feet, walking on the ground	Arborophila hyperythra	Hill dipterocarp forest; lower and upper montane forest	LC^{IUCN}	Also known as Bornean partridge.	157
3	Crimson-headed partridge	A rotund, dark brown bird with a crimson head and chest	Haematortyx sanguiniceps	Hill dipterocarp forest; lower and upper montane forest	LC^{IUCN}		157
4	Bulwer's pheasant	Photo of a large black bird with a bushy white tail, red legs and feet and bright blue head and throat wattles	Lophura bulweri	Hill and lower montane forest	VU^{IUCN}		
5	Bornean peacock-pheasant	Painting of two mottled brown birds with numerous green spots on wings and tail walking on the ground	Polyplectron schleiermacheri	Lowland and hill dipterocarp forest	EN^{IUCN}		
6	Dulit frogmouth	a large-headed, long-tailed, rufous-brown bird with many white markings	Batrachostomus harterti	Hill dipterocarp forest; lower montane forest	NT^{IUCN}		157
7	Bornean frogmouth		Batrachostomus mixtus	Hill dipterocarp forest; lower montane forest	NT^{IUCN}		
8	Bornean swiftlet		Collocalia dodgei	Upper montane forest	LC^{IUCN}	Sometimes considered to be a subspecies of the cave swiftlet or the glossy swiftlet.	
9	Bornean ground cuckoo	Bird with barred underparts and a black face with blue around the eyes	Carpococcyx radiceus	Lowland primary dipterocarp and riverine forest	NT^{IUCN}		
10	Mountain serpent eagle		Spilornis kinabaluensis	Upper montane forest	VU^{IUCN}		157
11	Whitehead's trogon	Photo of a red bird with a white collar and a black, white and brown striped tail sitting on a branch	Harpactes whiteheadi	Lower and upper montane forest	NT^{IUCN}		157
12	Mountain barbet		Psilopogon monticola	Lower and upper montane forest	LC^{IUCN}		157
13	Golden-naped barbet	Photo of a green bird with patches of blue on its head and gold on its neck, perched in dense vegetation	Psilopogon pulcherrimus	Upper montane forest	LC^{IUCN}		157
14	Bornean barbet	Painting of a green bird with patches of black, red, blue and yellow on its face, head, and throat	Psilopogon eximius	Lower and upper montane forest	LC^{IUCN}		157
15	Brown barbet	Photo of a small brown bird with patches of orange on its head, throat, and beak, perched in vegetation	Caloramphus fuliginosus	Lowland dipterocarp forest and lower hill forest, swamp forest and kerangas forest	LC^{IUCN}	Sometimes known as the Bornean brown barbet.	
16	White-fronted falconet	Painting of a small, dark-backed, white-fronted raptor with its wings partially out, standing on a large rhinoceros beetle	Microhierax latifrons	Lowland dipterocarp forest	NT^{IUCN}		s098
17	Hose's broadbill	Painting of a green bird with small black spots on its wings perched on a branch	Calyptomena hosii	Hill dipterocarp forest; lower montane forest	NT^{IUCN}		157
18	Whitehead's broadbill	green bird with a black throat, ear patch, and speckling perched on branch	Calyptomena whiteheadi	Lower and upper montane forest	LC^{IUCN}		157
19	Bornean banded pitta	bird with yellow-and-black striped head, brown back and black-barred yellow underparts	Hydrornis schwaneri	Lowland and hill dipterocarp forest	LC^{IUCN}		
20	Blue-headed pitta	Painting of two short-tailed, upright birds: one rust-backed with blue on head and underparts and a white throat, the other primarily brown with a blue tail and a white wing stripe	Hydrornis baudii	Lowland dipterocarp forest	VU^{IUCN}		
21	Black-crowned pitta	short-tailed bird, black with a red belly and an iridescent sky-blue wing	Erythropitta ussheri	Lowland dipterocarp forest	NT^{IUCN}		
22	Blue-banded pitta	Photo of bright red bird with oranger face and blue necklace standing on a log	Erythropitta arquata	Hill and lower montane forest, particularly bamboo groves	LC^{IUCN}		
23	Bornean bristlehead	Photo of a museum mount of a brown bird with a bare yellow head, heavy bill and reddish-orange throat, nape and breast	Pityriasis gymnocephala	Lowland and hill dipterocarp forest	NT^{IUCN}		
24	Bornean whistler	Photo of greyish-brown bird with yellowish underparts sitting on a branch	Pachycephala hypoxantha	Lower and upper montane forest	LC^{IUCN}		157
25	Black oriole	Painting of two black birds with reddish vents sitting on branches; one has a red bill	Oriolus hosii	Lower and upper montane forest	NT^{IUCN}		157
26	Bornean black magpie	Photo of a bright green bird with red beak and feet and maroon wings, sitting on a branch	Platysmurus aterrimus	Lowland forest and swamp forest	LC^{IUCN}	Formerly considered to be a subspecies of the black magpie; split in 2021.	
27	Bornean green magpie	Photo of a black bird with a short crest and a red eye, sitting on a branch	Cissa jefferyi	Lower forest	LC^{IUCN}		
28	Bornean treepie	Photo of a very long-tailed tan bird with black wings and tail, perched on a branch	Dendrocitta cinerascens	Hill dipterocarp forest; lower and upper montane forest	LC^{IUCN}		
29	Charlotte's bulbul	Photo of a rufous-brown bird with a pale belly and eye	Iole charlottae	Lowland and hill dipterocarp and peat swamp forests	NT^{IUCN}	Sometimes considered to be a subspecies of the buff-vented bulbul.	
30	Bornean bulbul	Photo of a yellow bird with an erect black crest	Rubigula montis	Lower and upper montane forest	LC^{IUCN}		
31	Cream-eyed bulbul		Pycnonotus pseudosimplex	Lowland and hill dipterocarp and peat swamp forests; lower montane forests	LC^{IUCN}		
32	Pale-faced bulbul	Photo of a grey-brown colored bird with yellow undertail feathers and patches of white on its face	Pycnonotus leucops	Upper montane forest	LC^{IUCN}	Sometimes considered to be a subspecies of the flavescent bulbul.	
33	Bornean stubtail	short-tailed bird with a brown back, white underparts, and a buffy eyebrow	Urosphena whiteheadi	Hill dipterocarp forest; lower and upper montane forest	LC^{IUCN}		157
34	Friendly bush-warbler	Painting of a brown bird with a black-speckled white throat perched on a branch	Locustella accentor	Upper montane forest	LC^{IUCN}		157
35	Chestnut-crested yuhina	bird with a brown crest, white belly, and grey upperparts	Staphida everetti	Hill dipterocarp forest; lower and upper montane forest	LC^{IUCN}		157
36	Pygmy white-eye		Heleia squamifrons	Hill dipterocarp forest and lower montane forest	LC^{IUCN}		157
37	Mountain blackeye	Photo of an olive-coloured bird with orange bill and legs and a black eye-ring	Zosterops emiliae	Upper montane forest	LC^{IUCN}		157
38	Meratus white-eye	Photo of a yellowish-olive bird with a white eye-ring being held by its feet	Zosterops meratusensis	Montane forest	LC^{IUCN}		
39	Bare-headed laughingthrush	Brown bird with bare yellow skin on the face and head, and orange beak	Melanocichla calva	Lower and upper montane forest	LC^{IUCN}		157
40	Black-throated wren-babbler	Scruffy brownish bird with deep red eye sitting on hand	Turdinus atrigularis	Lowland dipterocarp forest	NT^{IUCN}		
41	Black-browed babbler	Small brown bird with white and black face	Malacocincla perspicillata	Probably lowland forest	DD^{IUCN}	Rediscovered in 2020, more than 170 years after the only specimen was collected.	s099
42	Mountain wren-babbler	Scruffy brownish bird with black and white face	Gypsophila crassa	Lower and upper montane forest	LC^{IUCN}		157
43	Bornean wren-babbler		Ptilocichla leucogrammica	Lowland dipterocarp and peat swamp forests; kerangas forest	VU^{IUCN}		
44	Chestnut-hooded laughingthrush	Photo of a gray bird with a chestnut-brown head and a large white wing stripe sitting amidst vegetation	Pterorhinus treacheri	Hill dipterocarp forest; lower and upper montane forests	LC^{IUCN}		
45	Everett's thrush	Photo of a dark-backed, orange-bellied bird standing on the ground	Zoothera everetti	Lower and upper montane forest	NT^{IUCN}		157
46	Fruithunter	Photo of a tan bird with black wings, a black throat, and black eyeline sitting on a branch	Chlamydochaera jefferyi	Lower and upper montane forest	LC^{IUCN}		157
47	White-crowned shama	Black bird with orange belly and white stripe on head	Copsychus stricklandii	Lowland and hill dipterocarp and peat swamp forests; lower montane forest	LC^{IUCN}	Sometimes considered to be a subspecies of the white-rumped shama.	
48	Dayak blue flycatcher	Blue flycatcher with orange belly	Cyornis montanus	Montane forest	LC^{IUCN}	Sometimes considered to be a subspecies of the hill blue flycatcher (aka Javan blue flycatcher).	157
49	Meratus blue flycatcher	Blue flycatcher with orange belly	Cyornis kadayangensis	Montane forest	NT^{IUCN}		157
50	Bornean blue flycatcher	Blue flycatcher with orange belly	Cyornis superbus	Lowland and hill dipterocarp forest	LC^{IUCN}		
51	Crocker jungle flycatcher		Cyornis ruficrissa	Montane forest	Not recognised by IUCN	Sometimes considered to be a subspecies of the Philippine jungle flycatcher.	157
52	Eyebrowed jungle flycatcher	Brown flycatcher with grey belly	Vauriella gularis	Lower and upper montane forest	LC^{IUCN}		157
53	Bornean forktail	black and white bird	Enicurus borneensis	Streams in lower to upper montane forest	Not recognised by IUCN	Sometimes considered to be a subspecies of the white-crowned forktail.	
54	Bornean whistling thrush	Photo of uniformly matte black bird on a roadside curb	Myophonus borneensis	Lower and upper montane forest	LC^{IUCN}		
55	Bornean leafbird	green bird with dark throats and yellow around face	Chloropsis kinabaluensis	Lower and upper montane forest	LC^{IUCN}		
56	Yellow-rumped flowerpecker	Photo of blue-grey bird with bright orange and yellow underparts near pink blossom	Prionochilus xanthopygius	Lowland, hill and lower montane forest	LC^{IUCN}		
57	Spectacled flowerpecker	Painting of two grey birds with pale underparts among vegetation	Dicaeum dayakorum	Lowland and hill dipterocarp forest	DD^{IUCN}	Described to science in 2019.	
58	Black-sided flowerpecker	Photo of bird with blue-black back, black face, buffy underparts, and red throat eating a berry amidst vegetation	Dicaeum monticolum	Hill dipterocarp forest; lower and upper montane forest	LC^{IUCN}		157
59	Bornean spiderhunter		Arachnothera everetti	Lowland, hill, and lower montane forest	LC^{IUCN}	Sometimes considered to be a subspecies of streaky-breasted spiderhunter.	
60	Whitehead's spiderhunter	Illustration of bird with streaked brown and white body, yellow rump, and enormous black bill	Arachnothera juliae	Lower and upper montane forest	LC^{IUCN}		157
61	Dusky munia	Photo of thick-billed brown bird in vegetation	Lonchura fuscans	Scrub, gardens, grasslands, and rice paddies	LC^{IUCN}		

== See also ==
- Deforestation in Borneo

== Citations ==
=== References ===
- Akbar, Panji Gusti; Nugroho, Teguh Willy; Suranto, Muhammad; Fauzan, Muhammad Rizky; Ferdiansyah, Doddy; Trisiyanto, Joko Said & Yong, Ding Li (December 2020). "Missing for 170 years—the rediscovery of black-browed babbler Malacocincla perspicillata on Borneo". BirdingASIA. 34: 13–14.
- BirdLife International (2004). "Most Endemic Bird Areas are in the tropics and important for other biodiversity too". birdlife.org.
- BirdLife International (2016a). "Dulit Partridge: Rhizothera dulitensis". IUCN Red List of Threatened Species. 2016a e.T22728242A94976330.
- BirdLife International (2016b). "Bornean Partridge: Arborophila hyperthra". IUCN Red List of Threatened Species. 2016b e.T22679047A92800839.
- BirdLife International (2016c). "Bornean Brown Barbet: Caloramphus fuliginosus". IUCN Red List of Threatened Species. 2016c e.T22727049A94939526.
- BirdLife International (2021a). "Data Zone: Bornean coastal zone".
- BirdLife International (2021b). "Data Zone: Bornean mountains".
- BirdLife International (2021c). "Data Zone: Kalimantan lowlands".
- BirdLife International (2021d). "Data Zone: Natuna Islands".
- BirdLife International (2021e). "Data Zone: North-east Bornean islands".
- BirdLife International (2021f). "Data Zone: Sabah lowlands".
- BirdLife International (2021g). "Streaky-breasted Spiderhunter (Arachnothera affinis)".
- BirdLife International (2021h). "Data Zone: Silvery Pigeon Columba argentina".
- Borneo Today (18 May 2017). "Priceworth gets green light To log 'controversial' Sabah Forest Reserve". Archived from the original on May 21, 2017.
- "Copsychus malabaricus (white-rumped shama): notes on taxonomy and nomenclature". CABI. 2021.
- Cornell Lab of Ornithology (16 November 2015). "What is taxonomic order and why is it used for the sequence of birds in my field guide?". All About Birds.
- Curran, L.M.; Trigg, S.N.; McDonald, A.K.; Astiani, D.; Hardiono, Y.M.; Siregar, P.; Caniago, I.; Kasischke, E. (2004). "Lowland forest loss in protected areas of Indonesian Borneo" (PDF). Science. 303 (5660): 1000–1003. Bibcode:2004Sci...303.1000C. doi:10.1126/science.1091714. PMID 14963327. S2CID 45484999.
- Davison, G. W. H. (2016). Birds of Borneo: Sabah, Sarawak, Brunei and Kalimantan. London, UK: Bloomsbury Publishing. ISBN 978-1-4729-3287-7.
- "Enicurus leschenaulti". Integrated Taxonomic Information System. 2012c.
- Gawin, Dency F.; Rahman, Mustafa Abdul; Ramji, Mohamad Fizl Sidq; Smith, Brian Tilston; Lim, Haw Chuan; Moyle, Robert G. & Sheldon, Frederick H. (January 2014). "Patterns of avian diversification in Borneo: the case of the endemic mountain black-eye (Chlorocharis emiliae)". The Auk. 131 (1): 86–99. doi:10.1642/AUK-13-190.1. hdl:1808/16597. JSTOR 90008069. S2CID 13787326.
- Gill, Frank; Donsker, David & Rasmussen, Pamela, eds. (2021). "IOC World Bird List". IOC.
- "Iole olivacea". Integrated Taxonomic Information System. 2012a.
- Lim, B.T.M.; Sadanandan, K.R.; Dingle, C.; Leung, Y.Y.; Prawiradilaga, D.M.; Irham, M.; Ashari, H.; Lee, J.G.H. & Rheindt, F.E. (2018). "Molecular evidence suggests radical revision of species limits in the great speciator white‑eye genus Zosterops". Journal of Ornithology. 160: 1–16. doi:10.1007/s10336-018-1583-7. S2CID 51890116.
- Moyle, Robert G.; Filardi, Christopher F.; Smith, Catherine E. & Diamond, Jared (10 February 2009). "Explosive Pleistocene diversification and hemispheric expansion of a "great speciator"" (PDF). Proceedings of the National Academy of Sciences of the United States of America. 106 (6): 1863–1868. Bibcode:2009PNAS..106.1863M. doi:10.1073/pnas.0809861105. JSTOR 40421688. PMC 2644129. PMID 19181851.
- Moyle, Robert G.; Hosner, Peter A.; Nais, Jamili; Lakim, Maklarin & Sheldon, Frederick H. (March 2008). "Taxonomic status of the Kinabalu 'linchi' swiftlet". Bulletin of the British Ornithologists' Club. 128 (2): 94–100.
- Myers, Susan (2016). Birds of Borneo (2nd ed.). London, UK: Christopher Helm. ISBN 978-1-4729-2444-5.
- Phillipps, Quentin & Phillipps, Karen (2014). Phillipps' Field Guide to the Birds of Borneo: Sabah, Sarawak, Brunei, and Kalimantan (3rd ed.). Princeton, NJ: Princeton University Press. ISBN 978-0-691-16167-9.
- "Pycnonotus flavescens". Integrated Taxonomic Information System. 2012b.
- Saucier, Jacob R.; Milensky, Christopher M.; Caraballo-Ortiz, Marcos A.; Ragai, Roslina; Dahlan, N. Faridah & Edwards, David P. (2019). "A distinctive new species of flowerpecker (Passeriformes: Dicaeidae) from Borneo" (PDF). Zootaxa. 4686 (4): 451–464. doi:10.11646/zootaxa.4686.4.1. PMID 31719467. S2CID 207962716.
- Stattersfield, Alison J.; Crosby, Michael J.; Long, Adrian J. & Wege, David C. (1998). Endemic Bird Areas of the World: Priorities for Biodiversity Conservation. Cambridge, UK: BirdLife International. ISBN 978-0-946888-33-7.
