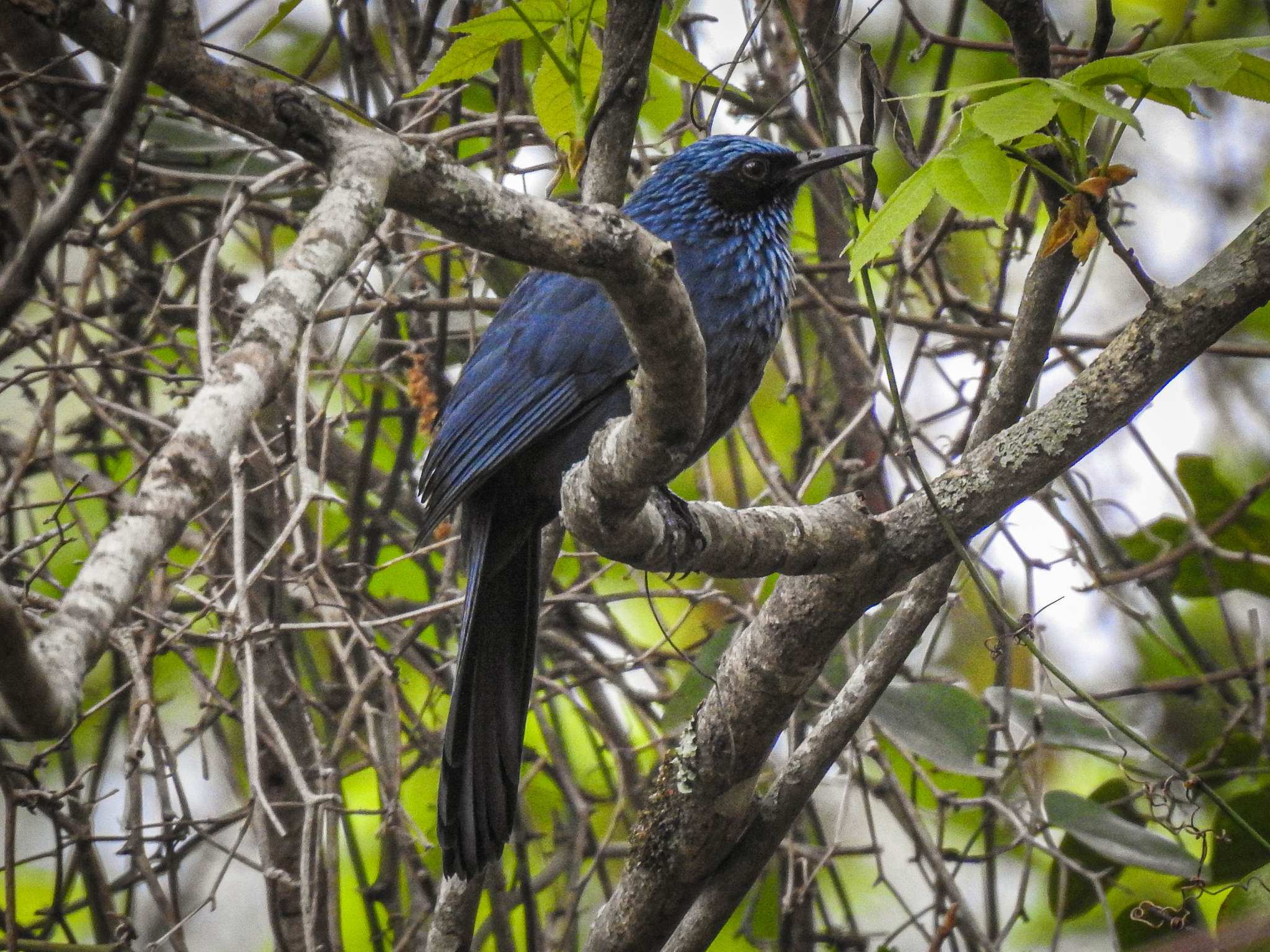

Conservation status
- Least Concern (IUCN 3.1)

Scientific classification
- Kingdom: Animalia
- Phylum: Chordata
- Class: Aves
- Order: Passeriformes
- Family: Mimidae
- Genus: Melanotis
- Species: M. caerulescens

Binomial name
- Melanotis caerulescens (Swainson, 1827)

= Blue mockingbird =

Species of bird

The blue mockingbird (Melanotis caerulescens) is a species of bird in the family Mimidae. It is endemic to Mexico, but has occurred as a vagrant in the southern United States. Its natural habitats are subtropical or tropical dry forests, subtropical or tropical moist montane forests, and heavily degraded former forest.

The blue mockingbird is uniformly blue on its back, tail, wings, head and underbelly. This color is a result of feather structure rather than pigment, and therefore can look gray in the shade. It has a black "mask" surrounding its reddish-brown eyes. It has a rather long, slightly graduated tail, and dark blue streaks over its breast. Its bill is long, thin and slightly curved, and its legs and feet are black.

== Taxonomy ==
When he first described the blue mockingbird in 1827, William Swainson assigned it to the mockingbird Orpheus, and when Orpheus became a junior synonym for the genus Mimus, the species was moved accordingly. Not all authorities agreed; several placed it in the thrush Turdus. However, when Charles Lucien Bonaparte moved it to its current genus Melanotis in 1850, most authorities quickly followed suit. There is disagreement as to whether it is monotypic or not.

Among taxonomists who believe the species is polytypic, two subspecies are generally recognized.

- M. c. caerulescens, the nominate subspecies, is found in the pine-oak zone of western Mexico, from southern Sonora south to the Isthmus of Tehuantepec.
- M. c. longirostris is found only on the Tres Marías Islands, off the coast of western Mexico.

The blue mockingbird has historically been considered conspecific with the closely related blue-and-white mockingbird. Its species name is derived from the Latin adjective caerǔlěus, meaning "blue".

== Description ==
Measuring 9.5–10.5 in (24–27 cm) in length, and weighing between 50.2 and 59.7 g (1.77 and 2.11 oz), the blue mockingbird is a medium-sized mimid. Individuals of the subspecies caerulescens have a mean body mass slightly higher than that for individuals of the subspecies longirostris — 63.5 g (2.24 oz) for the former and 59.7 g (2.11 oz) for the latter.

== Habitat and range ==
The blue mockingbird lives in a variety of woodlands: humid forest, riparian thickets, scrub, pine-oak forests and second growth. It is found at elevations ranging from lowlands to 2,450 m (8,040 ft).

== Behavior ==
=== Breeding ===
The blue mockingbird builds a cup nest of twigs and rootlets.

=== Food and feeding ===
The blue mockingbird is an omnivore; it feeds primarily on invertebrates, but also on some vegetable matter.

== Conservation and threats ==
Because of its very large range and sizable population (estimated to number 500,000–4,999,999 individuals), the blue mockingbird is rated as a species of least concern by the International Union for Conservation of Nature. There is, however, evidence that its overall numbers are dropping, primarily due to habitat fragmentation and loss. The Mexican government has named the longirostris subspecies as a taxon of "special concern".
