= Putting Biodiversity on the Map =

1992 book

Putting biodiversity on the map: priority areas for global conservation
- Author: C. J. Bibby, N. J. Collar, M. J. Crosby, M.F. Heath, Ch. Imboden, T. H. Johnson, A. J. Long, A. J. Stattersfield, S. J. Thirgood
- Subject: Ornithology
- Genre: Non-fiction
- Publisher: International Council for Bird Preservation
- Publication date: 1992
- Pages: 90
- ISBN: 0-946888-24-8

Putting biodiversity on the map: priority areas for global conservation by C. J. Bibby, N. J. Collar, M. J. Crosby, M.F. Heath, Ch. Imboden, T. H. Johnson, A. J. Long, A. J. Stattersfield and S. J. Thirgood (ISBN 0-946888-24-8) is a 1992 book published by the International Council for Bird Preservation.

The book introduced the Endemic Bird Area (EBA) concept and argued for its use as a means of identifying important areas for the conservation of all biodiversity worldwide.

The book starts with a number of sections outlining its overall aim, scope and methods. This is followed by a global overview, which is followed in turn by regional overviews for six regions:

- North and Central America
- South America
- Africa, Europe and the Middle East
- Continental Asia
- South-east Asian Islands, New Guinea and Australia
- Pacific Islands

This is followed by a similar set of regional analyses for other groups of animals and plants. Two final sections set out recommendations for the use of EBAs in conservation priority setting, and a set of conclusions. A number of appendices give detailed data in tabular form on EBAs and their importance.

The book does not describe the individual Endemic Bird Areas in detail; a subsequent more detailed publication, Endemic Bird Areas of the World: Priorities for Biodiversity Conservation does so, however.

The book is 90 pages long. It has a foreword by Edward O. Wilson.
