= Short-tailed magpie =

The short-tailed magpies are two species of magpies that used to be considered conspecific:

- Javan green magpie (Cissa thalassina)
- Bornean green magpie (Cissa jefferyi)
