= List of endemic birds of western North America =

This article is one of a series providing information about endemism among birds in the world's various zoogeographic zones. For an overview of this subject see Endemism in birds.

This article covers western North America, i.e. the regions of the United States and Canada which lie west of the Great Plains.

== Patterns of endemism ==
There are no families endemic to this region.

The following genera are endemic to the region:

- Dendragapus, the blue grouse (2 species)
- Chamaea, wrentit (1 species)

== Endemic Bird Areas ==
Most bird species which are endemic to this region have ranges which are too large to qualify for BirdLife International's restricted-range endemic status. As a result, only one Endemic Bird Area has been defined, in California.

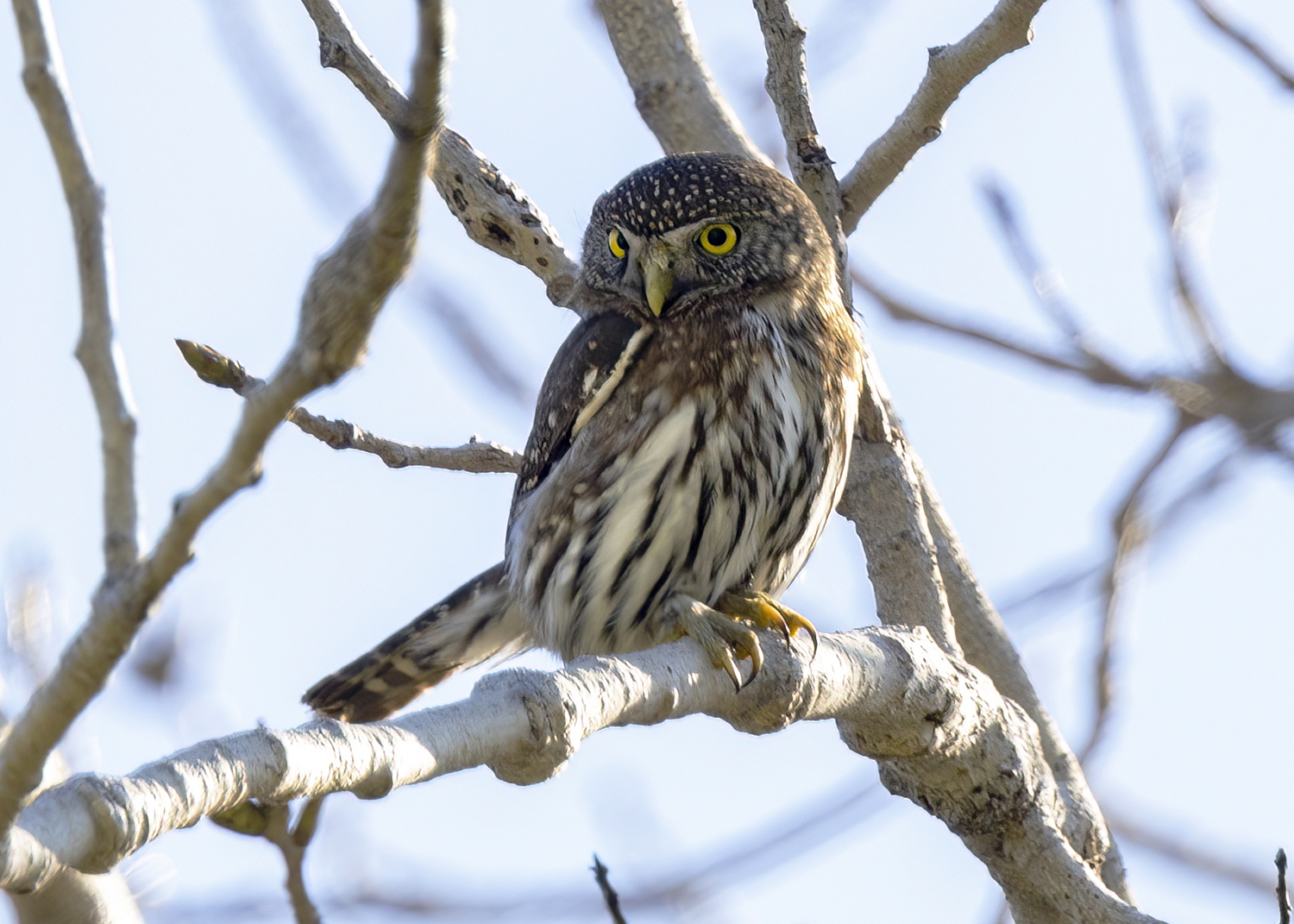
Northern pygmy owl

== List of species ==
The following is a list of species endemic to this region:

- California condor
- California quail
- Gambel's quail
- Mountain quail
- Sooty grouse
- Dusky grouse
- Greater sage-grouse
- Gunnison grouse
- White-tailed ptarmigan
- Prairie falcon
- Black oystercatcher
- Black turnstone
- Surfbird
- Heermann's gull
- Spotted owl
- Flammulated owl
- Northern pygmy owl
- Anna's hummingbird
- Lewis's woodpecker
- Williamson's sapsucker
- Red-breasted sapsucker
- Red-naped sapsucker
- Nuttall's woodpecker
- White-headed woodpecker
- Gray vireo
- Pinyon jay
- California scrub jay
- Santa Cruz Island scrub jay
- Yellow-billed magpie
- Northwestern crow
- Oak titmouse
- Juniper titmouse
- Mountain chickadee
- Chestnut-backed chickadee
- Pacific wren
- Wrentit
- Mountain bluebird
- Varied thrush
- Sage thrasher
- California thrasher
- Bendire's thrasher
- Le Conte's thrasher
- McKay's bunting
- Green-tailed towhee
- California towhee
- Abert's towhee
- Rufous-winged sparrow
- Brewer's sparrow
- Bell's sparrow
- Sagebrush sparrow
- Golden-crowned sparrow
- Tri-colored blackbird
- Gray-crowned rosy finch
- Brown-capped rosy finch
- Black rosy finch
- Cassin's finch
- Lawrence's goldfinch

In addition, the following are endemic as breeding species:

- Fork-tailed storm-petrel
- Whooping crane
- Mountain plover
- Bristle-thighed curlew
- Long-billed curlew
- Aleutian tern
- Hammond's flycatcher
- Gray flycatcher
- Dusky flycatcher
- Cassin's vireo
- Virginia's warbler
- Lucy's warbler
- Black-throated gray warbler
- Hermit warbler
- Townsend's warbler
- MacGillivray's warbler
- Western tanager
- Lazuli bunting
- Bullock's oriole

The following species are near-endemic:

- Red-faced cormorant
- Pelagic cormorant
- Brandt's cormorant
- Trumpeter swan
- Cinnamon teal
- Glaucous-winged gull ? (12% of the population winters in Asia)
- Western gull
- Western screech owl
- Common poorwill

The following species spend the winter wholly within the region:

- Western grebe ?
- Clark's grebe ?
