= List of endemic birds of eastern North America =

This article is one of a series providing information about endemism among birds in the World's various zoogeographic zones. For an overview of this subject see Endemism in birds.

This article covers eastern North America, i.e. the regions of the United States and Canada which lie east of the Rocky Mountains.

== Patterns of endemism ==
There are no families endemic to this region, although a high proportion of the species in the following families are endemics or near-endemics:

- the New World warblers, Parulidae

== Endemic Bird Areas ==
Most bird species that are endemic to this region have ranges that are too large to qualify for Birdlife International's restricted-range endemic status; consequently, this region has no Endemic Bird Areas defined. However, there are two secondary areas, namely:

- Michigan Jack pine savanna (code s003), the breeding grounds of Kirtland's warbler.
- The Edwards Plateau (code s004), the breeding grounds of golden-cheeked warbler (and also an important area for black-capped vireo).

== List of species ==
The following is a list of species endemic to this region:

- American black duck
- Lesser prairie-chicken
- Greater prairie-chicken
- King rail
- Whooping crane
- American woodcock
- Red-cockaded woodpecker
- Red-headed woodpecker
- Red-bellied woodpecker
- Florida scrub-jay
- Fish crow
- Tufted titmouse
- Carolina chickadee
- Brown-headed nuthatch
- Brown thrasher
- Eastern towhee
- Bachman's sparrow
- Saltmarsh sparrow
- Seaside sparrow
- Boat-tailed grackle

Remaining passerines to be added

In addition, the following are endemic as breeding species:

- Mississippi kite
- Broad-winged hawk
- Piping plover
- Mountain plover
- Marbled godwit
- Black-billed cuckoo
- Chuck-will's-widow
- Eastern whip-poor-will
- Chimney swift
- Ruby-throated hummingbird
- Eastern wood pewee
- Acadian flycatcher
- Eastern phoebe
- Great crested flycatcher
- White-eyed vireo
- Yellow-throated vireo
- Blue-headed vireo
- Philadelphia vireo
- Bicknell's thrush
- Wood thrush
- Blue-winged warbler
- Golden-winged warbler
- Northern parula
- Chestnut-sided warbler
- Black-throated blue warbler
- Black-throated green warbler
- Golden-cheeked warbler
- Blackburnian warbler
- Cerulean warbler
- Yellow-throated warbler
- Kirtland's warbler
- Prairie warbler
- Black-and-white warbler
- Worm-eating warbler
- Swainson's warbler
- Prothonotary warbler
- Louisiana waterthrush
- Mourning warbler
- Connecticut warbler
- Kentucky warbler
- Canada warbler
- Hooded warbler
- Field sparrow
- Henslow's sparrow
- Scarlet tanager
- Dickcissel
- Rose-breasted grosbeak
- Baltimore oriole

Remaining passerines to be added

The following species are near-endemic:

- Yellow rail
- Eastern screech-owl

List of passerines to be added
