= Kanhargaon Wildlife Sanctuary =

Wildlife sanctuary in Chandrapur district, Maharashtra, India

- Location within Maharashtra Location within India
- Interactive map of Kanhargaon Wildlife Sanctuary
- Location: Chandrapur district, Maharashtra, India
- Nearest city: Gondpipri
- Coordinates: 19.68°N 79.68°E
- Area: 269 km^{2} (104 sq mi)
- Designation: Wildlife sanctuary
- Established: 2021
- Governing body: Forest Department, Government of Maharashtra

Kanhargaon Wildlife Sanctuary is a wildlife sanctuary located in Chandrapur district of the Indian state of Maharashtra. The sanctuary was officially notified in 2021 and covers an area of approximately 269 square kilometres, making it the 50th wildlife sanctuary declared in the state. It forms part of the central Indian forest landscape and is considered important for wildlife conservation in eastern Maharashtra.

== History ==
Kanhargaon Wildlife Sanctuary was notified under the provisions of the Wildlife (Protection) Act, 1972, through a state government gazette issued in 2021.

- The declaration formed part of Maharashtra's initiative to expand its protected area network and strengthen conservation of forest habitats outside existing tiger reserves.

== Flora & Fauna ==
The vegetation of the sanctuary is predominantly dry deciduous forest, typical of the central Indian region. Dominant plant species include teak (Tectona grandis), bamboo, tendu (Diospyros melanoxylon), and mixed deciduous tree species.

The sanctuary lies within an important tiger landscape of eastern Maharashtra. Other animals include leopard (Panthera pardus), gaur (Bos gaurus), sambar (Rusa unicolor), chital (Axis axis), wild boar, and a variety of bird and reptile species.

The sanctuary acts as habitat connectivity between major protected areas such as Tadoba–Andhari Tiger Reserve and adjoining forest blocks.

== Management ==
The sanctuary is managed by the Forest Department of the Government of Maharashtra. Following notification, boundary demarcation and preparation of a management plan were initiated under state and central conservation programmes.

== See also ==
- Panna National Park
- Bir Aishvan Wildlife Sanctuary
