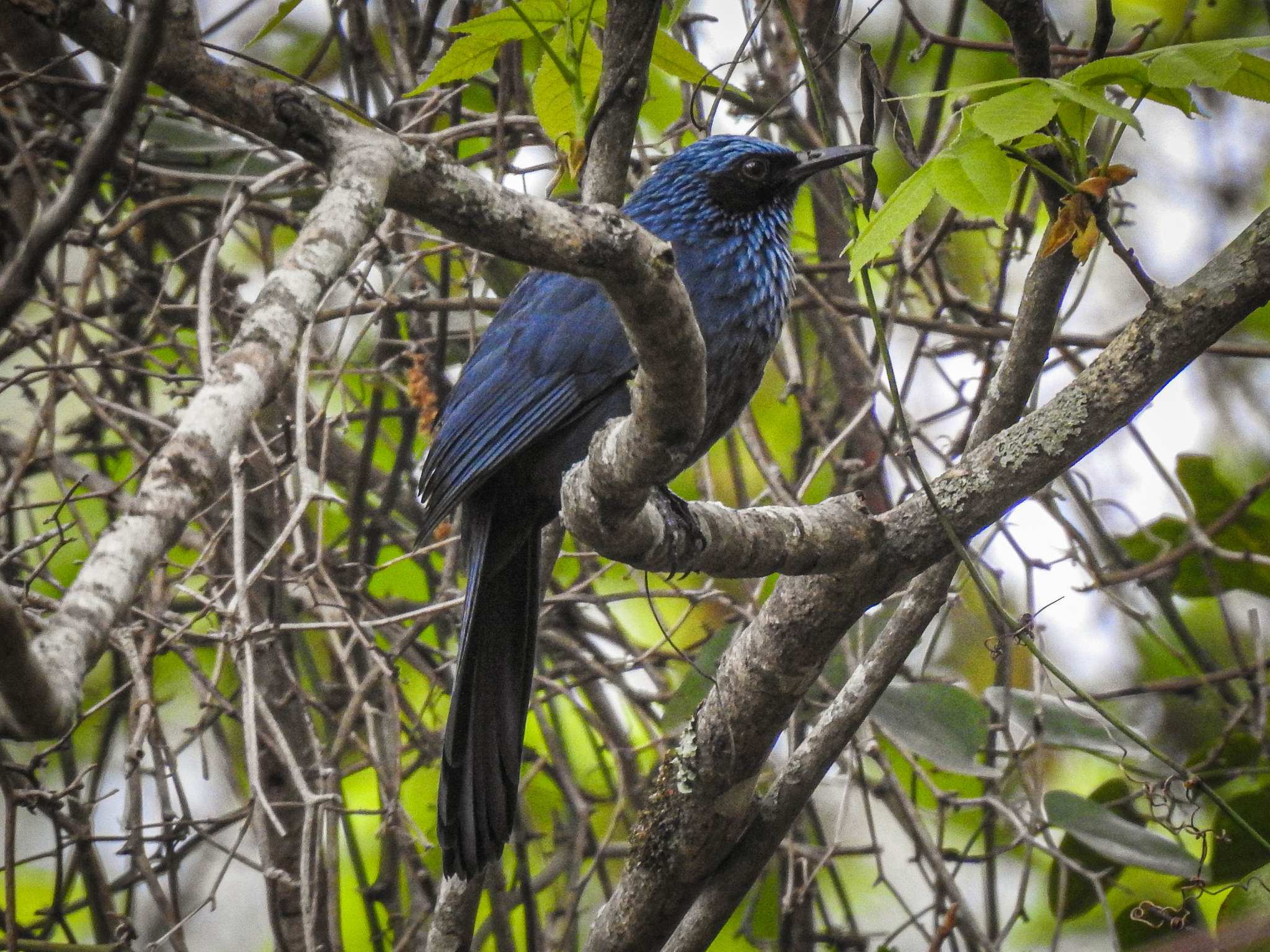
- Blue mockingbird (Melanotis caerulescens)

Scientific classification
- Kingdom: Animalia
- Phylum: Chordata
- Class: Aves
- Order: Passeriformes
- Family: Mimidae
- Genus: Melanotis; Bonaparte, 1850

Type species
- Turdus melanotis Temminck, 1830

Species
- M. caerulescens M. hypoleucus

= Melanotis =

Genus of birds

Melanotis is a genus of bird in the family Mimidae. It contains the following species:

Image	Common name	Scientific name	Distribution
	Blue mockingbird	Melanotis caerulescens	Mexico
	Blue-and-white mockingbird	Melanotis hypoleucus	El Salvador, Guatemala, Honduras, and Mexico

== Etymology ==
The word Melanotis is derived from the Ancient Greek roots melano-/μελανο- "black" and ot-/ὠτ- "ear".

== Description ==
The two Melanotis species are the world's most brightly colored mockingbirds.
