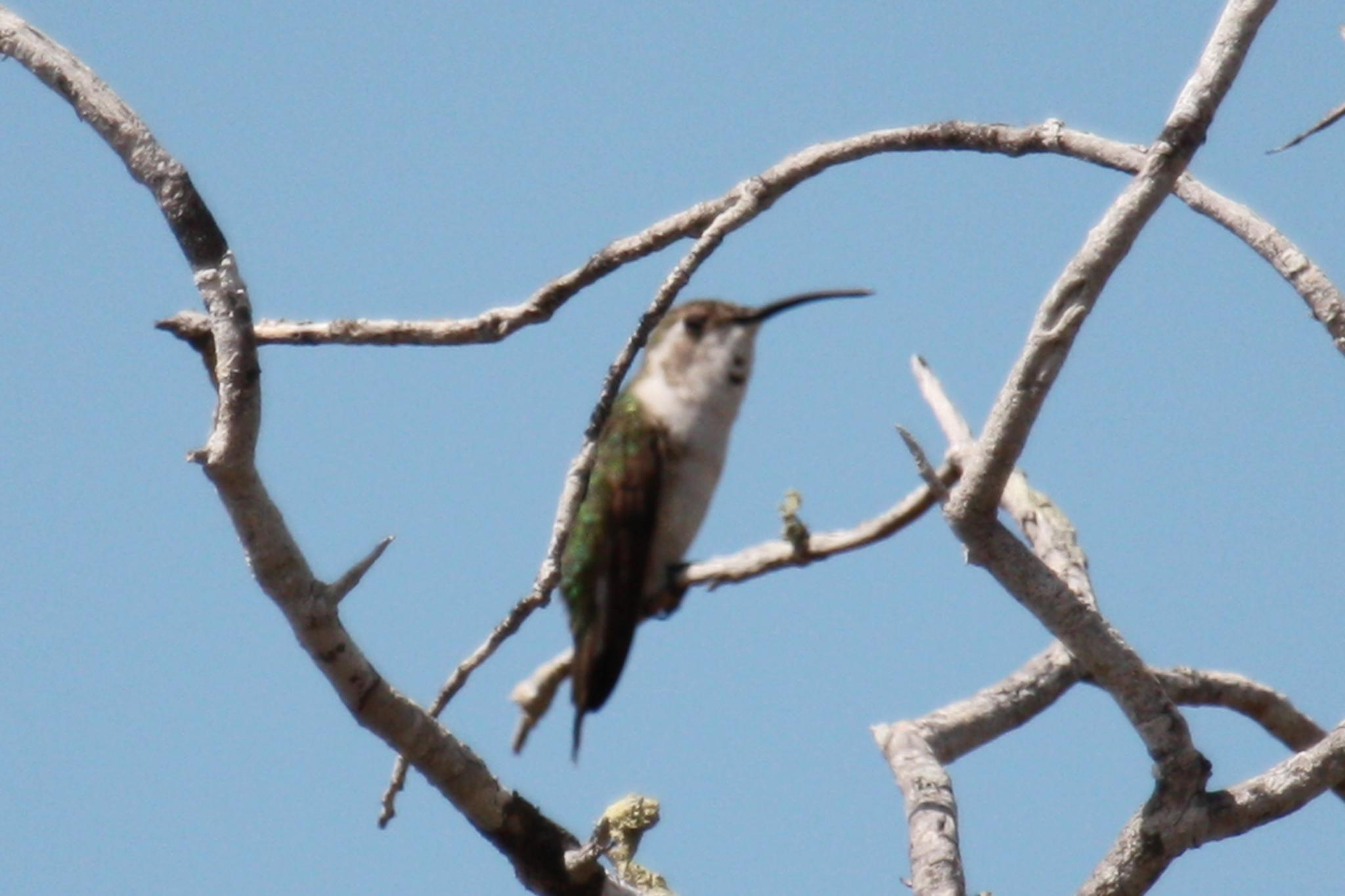
- Female Mexican sheartail, Doricha eliza

Scientific classification
- Kingdom: Animalia
- Phylum: Chordata
- Class: Aves
- Order: Apodiformes
- Family: Trochilidae
- Tribe: Mellisugini
- Genus: Doricha; Reichenbach, 1854

Type species
- Trochilus enicurus (slender sheartail) Vieillot, 1818

= Doricha =

Genus of birds

Doricha is a genus of hummingbirds in the family Trochilidae that are found in Central America.

== Taxonomy ==
The genus Doricha was introduced in 1854 by the German naturalist Ludwig Reichenbach to accommodate the slender sheartail which is thus the type species. The genus name comes from an ancient Greek courtesan.

A 2014 molecular phylogenetic study by Jimmy McGuire and collaborators found that the genus Doricha was sister to the genus Calothorax.

The genus contains the following two species:

Male	Female	Common name	Scientific name	Distribution
		Slender sheartail	Doricha enicura	
		Mexican sheartail	Doricha eliza	
