= Central Indian Forests =

The Central Indian Forests have been defined by BirdLife International as an Endemic Bird Area as it includes the range of the critically endangered forest owlet. It includes the southern region of Madhya Pradesh, the Vidarbha region of Maharashtra and Chhattisgarh. This forest consists of dry deciduous trees. Many wildlife sanctuaries and national parks are within these forests. For example: Kanha National Park, Pench National Park, Kanhargaon Wildlife Sanctuary and Melghat wildlife sanctuary. The forest owlet was thought to be extinct but was rediscovered in Melghat.
