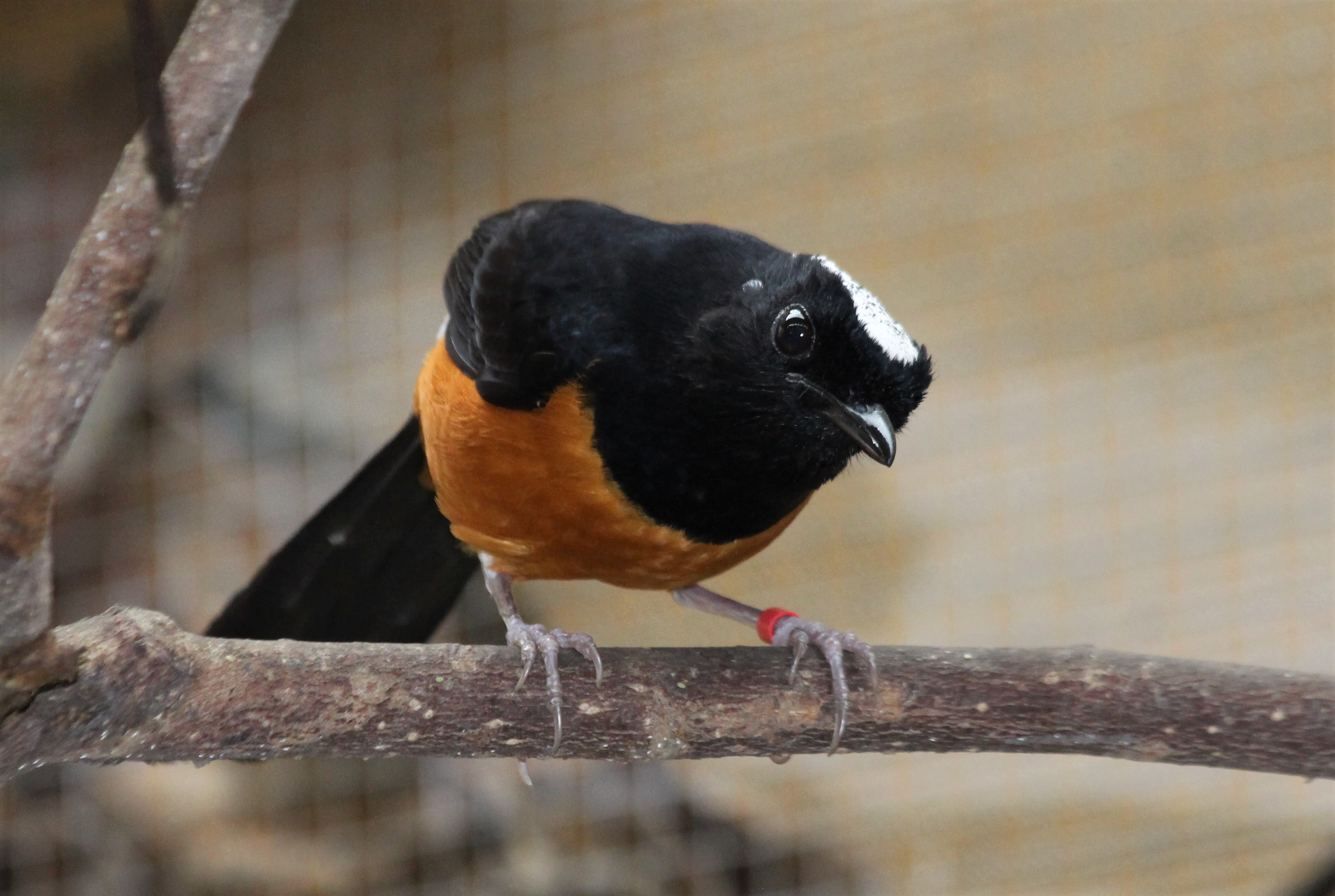

Conservation status
- Not evaluated (IUCN 3.1)

Scientific classification
- Kingdom: Animalia
- Phylum: Chordata
- Class: Aves
- Order: Passeriformes
- Family: Muscicapidae
- Genus: Copsychus
- Species: C. barbouri

Binomial name
- Copsychus barbouri (Bangs & Peters, JL, 1927)

= Maratua shama =

Species of bird

The Maratua shama (Copsychus barbouri) is a medium-sized passerine bird in the Old World flycatcher family Muscicapidae that is found on the small island of Maratua, east of Borneo in Indonesia. It may now be extinct in the wild. It was formerly treated as a subspecies of the white-crowned shama.

== Taxonomy ==
The Maratua shama was formally described in 1927 by the American ornithologists Outram Bangs and James L. Peters based on specimens collected on the island of Maratua by the Swedish naturalist Eric Mjöberg. Outram and Peters coined the binomial name Kittacincla barbouri where the specific epithet was chosen to honour the zoologist Thomas Barbour. The Maratua shama is now placed with 16 other species in the genus Copsychus that was introduced in 1827 by the German naturalist Johann Georg Wagler. It was formerly considered to be subspecies of the white-crowned shama (Copsychus stricklandii) but is now treated as a separate species based on differences in morphology and mitochondrial DNA sequences. The species is monotypic: no subspecies are recognised.

== Description ==
The male Maratua shama has a white crown, black upperparts, bright chestnut underparts, a white rump and a completely black tail. The female is similar to the male but is smaller and the black feathers are duller and less glossy.

== Conservation status ==
The Maratua shama is highly threatened by the cagebird trade and is possibly extinct in the wild.
