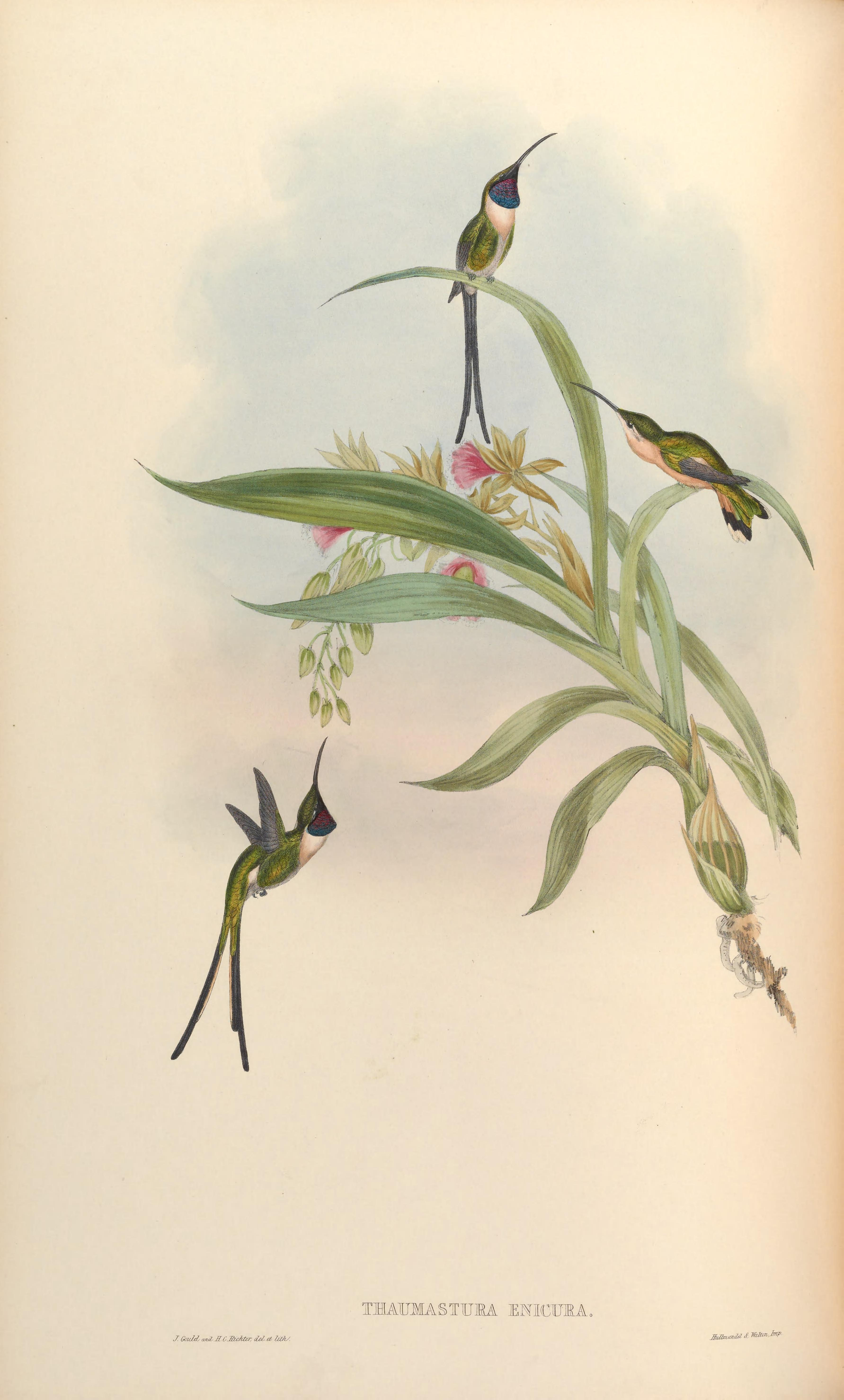

Conservation status
- Least Concern (IUCN 3.1)
- CITES Appendix II (CITES)

Scientific classification
- Kingdom: Animalia
- Phylum: Chordata
- Class: Aves
- Clade: Strisores
- Order: Apodiformes
- Family: Trochilidae
- Genus: Doricha
- Species: D. enicura

Binomial name
- Doricha enicura (Vieillot, 1818)

Synonyms
- Trochilus enicurus (protonym)

= Slender sheartail =

Species of hummingbird

The slender sheartail (Doricha enicura) is a species of hummingbird in tribe Mellisugini of subfamily Trochilinae, the "bee hummingbirds". It is found in El Salvador, Guatemala, Honduras, and Mexico.

== Taxonomy and systematics ==
The slender sheartail shares genus Doricha with the Mexican sheartail (D. eliza). It is monotypic.

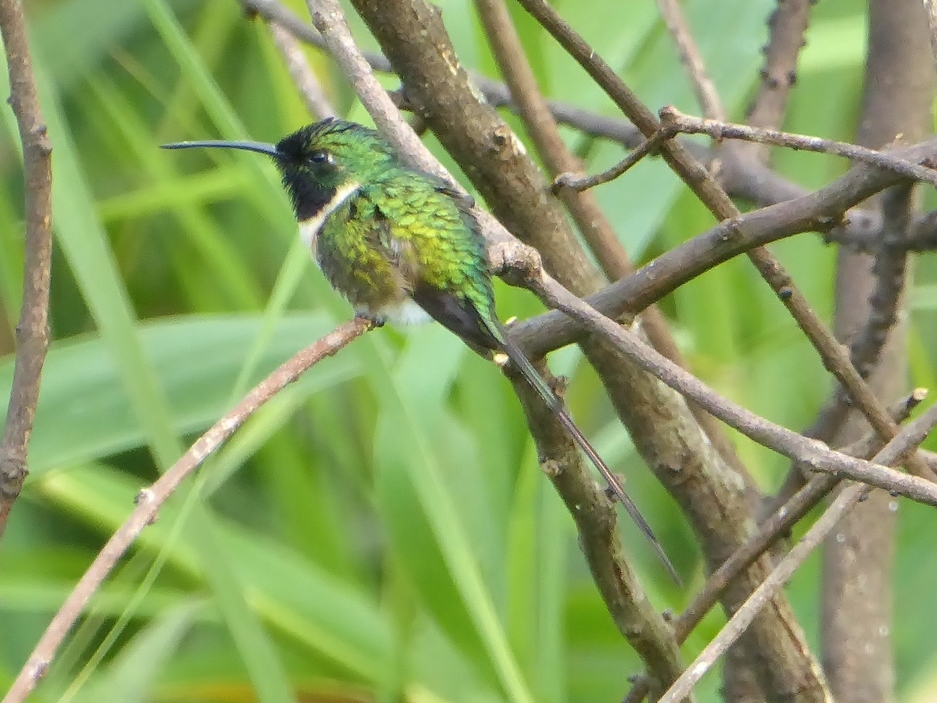
Male

== Description ==
The male slender sheartail is 11 to 12.5 cm (4.3 to 4.9 in) long and weighs about 2.3 g (0.081 oz). Females are 8 to 9 cm (3.1 to 3.5 in) long and weigh about 2.6 g (0.092 oz). Both sexes have a long, decurved, black bill and a white spot behind the eye. The male's head, upperparts, and sides of the belly are green. Its gorget is pinkish purple and the chest and center of the belly white. The very long tail is deeply forked. The central pair of feathers are green and the others blackish. The female's upperparts are green and the underparts cinnamon-buff. It has a blackish stripe through the eye. Its tail is much shorter and less forked than the male's; its central pair of feathers are green and the others cinnamon with a wide black band near the tip and white tips.

== Distribution and habitat ==
The slender sheartail is found in mountains and their interior valleys from Chiapas in southern Mexico through Guatemala and northeastern El Salvador into Honduras. It inhabits semi-open landscapes such as forest openings, woodland, secondary forest, and scrublands. In elevation it ranges between 1,000 and 3,000 m (3,300 and 9,800 ft).

== Behavior ==
=== Movement ===
The slender sheartail is generally sedentary though there are seasonal changes in abundance.

=== Feeding ===
The slender sheartail forages for nectar and small arthropods from ground level to the middle strata of the vegetation. While feeding on nectar, males hold their tails nearly vertical while females wag and open and close theirs.

=== Breeding ===
The slender sheartail has been documented breeding in October in Chiapas, but nothing else is known about its breeding phenology.

=== Vocalization ===
The slender sheartail's vocalizations are poorly known and have seldom been recorded. It does make "fairly hard, rapid chips" while perched or feeding.

== Status ==
The IUCN has assessed the slender sheartail as being of Least Concern. It has a fairly large range and an estimated population of between 20,000 and 50,000 mature individuals. However, the population is believed to be decreasing. It is considered rare to locally common. The main threat to it is clearing of its habitat for agriculture.
