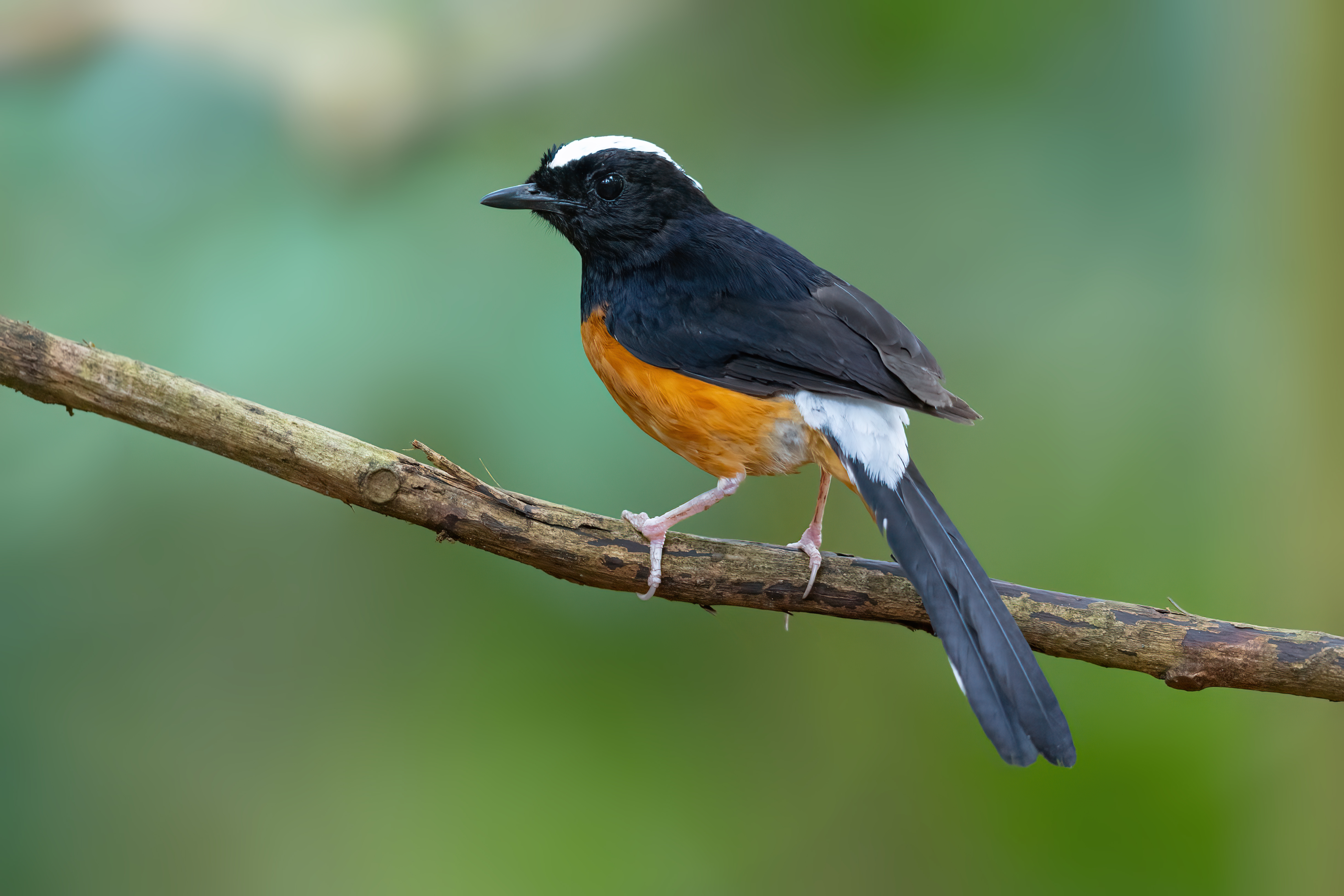
- In Sabah, Malaysia

Scientific classification
- Kingdom: Animalia
- Phylum: Chordata
- Class: Aves
- Order: Passeriformes
- Family: Muscicapidae
- Genus: Copsychus
- Species: C. stricklandii

Binomial name
- Copsychus stricklandii Motley & Dillwyn, 1855

= White-crowned shama =

Species of bird

The white-crowned shama (Copsychus stricklandii) is a medium sized passerine bird in the Old World flycatcher family Muscicapidae. It is endemic to the Southeast Asian island of Borneo. The Maratua shama was formerly treated as a subspecies.

== Taxonomy ==
It is closely related to the white-rumped shama (Copsychus malabaricus), and has in the past been sometimes considered a subspecies of that species. The Maratua shama was formerly treated as a subspecies but is now treated as a separate species based on the differences in morphology and mitochondrial DNA sequences. The white-crowned shama is now monotypic: no subspecies are recognised.

The specific name was bestowed in honour of Hugh Edwin Strickland

== Description ==
The white-crowned shama is about 21–28 cm (8.3–11.0 in) in length (including a 7 cm (2.8 in) tail in adult males) and 31–42 g (1.1–1.5 oz) in weight. Mainly blue-black upperparts contrast with orange-rufous underparts. It has a white rump and black throat. It is largely similar in appearance to the white-rumped shama subspecies C. m. suavis, which replaces it in southern and western Borneo, and hybridises with it where the ranges meet. It differs in having a white, rather than black, crown. The distinctive Maratua form C. s. barbouri is about 20% longer than the nominate, and has an all-black tail, rather than white outer rectrices.

== Aviculture ==
White-crowned shamas are bred by local aviculturists in Borneo as cage-birds valued for their singing ability. They continue to be trapped as it is believed that wild-caught young birds are stronger, and better songsters, than those bred in captivity.
