= List of endemic birds of the Himalayas =

This article is one of a series providing information about endemism among birds in the world's various zoogeographic zones. For an overview of this subject see Endemism in birds.

== List of species ==
=== Western Himalayan endemics ===
- Black-crested tit (Periparus ater melanolophus)
- Black-headed jay (Garrulus lanceolatus)
- Brooks's leaf-warbler (Phylloscopus subviridis)
- Cheer pheasant (Catreus wallichi)
- Himalayan black-lored tit (Machlolophus xanthogenys)
- Himalayan bluetail (Tarsiger rufilatus)
- Himalayan monal (Lophophorus impejanus)
- Himalayan shrike-babbler (Pteruthius ripleyi)
- Himalayan snowcock (Tetraogallus himalayensis)
- Himalayan vulture (Gyps himalayensis)
- Hodgson's treecreeper (Certhia hodgsoni)
- Kashmir flycatcher (Ficedula subrubra)
- Kashmir nuthatch (Sitta cashmirensis)
- Koklass pheasant (Pucrasia macrolopha)
- Kashmir nutcracker (Nucifraga multipunctata)
- Orange bullfinch (Pyrrhula aurantiaca)
- Slaty-headed parakeet (Psittacula himalayana)
- Snow partridge (Lerwa lerwa)
- Snow pigeon (Columba leuconota)
- Spectacled finch (Callacanthis burtoni)
- Tibetan blackbird (Turdus maximus)
- Western tragopan (Tragopan melanocephalus)
- White-cheeked tit (Aegithalos leucogenys)
- White-throated tit (Aegithalos niveogularis)
- White-cheeked nuthatch ( Sitta leucopsis)

=== Central Himalayan endemics ===
- Hoary-throated barwing (Actinodura nipalensis)
- Nepal cupwing (Pnoepyga immaculata)
- Spiny babbler (Turdoides nipalensis)

kahef

=== Eastern Himalayan endemics ===
- Beautiful sibia (Heterophasia pulchella)
- Blyth's tragopan (Tragopan blythii)
- Broad-billed warbler (Tickellia hodgsoni)
- Brown-capped laughingthrush (Garrulax austeni)
- Brown-throated fulvetta (Alcippe ludlowi)
- Chestnut-breasted partridge (Arborophila mandellii)
- Dark-rumped swift (Apus acuticauda)
- Grey sibia (Heterophasia gracilis)
- Hoary-throated barwing (Actinodura nipalensis)
- Rufous-throated wren-babbler (Spelaeornis caudatus)
- Rusty-bellied shortwing (Brachypteryx hyperythra)
- Mishmi wren-babbler (Spelaeornis badeigularis)
- Sclater's monal (Lophophorus sclateri)
- Snowy-throated babbler (Stachyris oglei)
- Streak-throated barwing (Actinodura waldeni)
- Striped laughingthrush (Garrulax virgatus)
- Tawny-breasted wren-babbler (Spelaeornis longicaudatus)
- Ward's trogon (Harpactes wardi)
- White-browed nuthatch (Sitta victoriae)
- White-naped yuhina (Yuhina bakeri)
- Yellow-vented warbler (Phylloscopus cantator))

=== Near-endemics ===
The following species are almost wholly confined to the Himalayas, with only a small part of their range occurring beyond.

- White-tailed nuthatch
- Yellow-browed tit
