= List of secondary endemic bird areas of the world =

The following is a list of areas classified by Birdlife International as Secondary Areas, namely areas which contain at least one restricted-range endemic bird species, but do not qualify for the full Endemic Bird Area status.

== Secondary areas in North and Central America ==
| Birdlife Code | Name | Location | Restricted-range endemics and other notable species |
| s001 | Eastern Bering Sea Islands | The islands of St Matthew, Hall Island, St Lawrence, St Paul and St George, in the Bering Sea, Alaska | Breeding grounds of McKay's bunting |
| s002 | Seward Peninsula and Yukon Delta | Alaska | Breeding grounds of bristle-thighed curlew |
| s003 | Michigan Jack pine savanna | Michigan | Breeding grounds of Kirtland's warbler |
| s004 | Edwards Plateau | Central Texas | Breeding grounds of golden-cheeked warbler (and also an important area for the non-restricted-range black-capped vireo) |
| s005 | South Veracruz coastal scrub | Mexico | isolated population of Mexican sheartail |
| s006 | South Mexican karst forests | The area between Córdoba, Veracruz and Cerro Oro, Oaxaca, Mexico | The world range of Sumichrast's wren |
| s007 | Eastern Yucatán | The east Caribbean coast of the Yucatán Peninsula in Mexico and Belize, and offshore islands belonging to Mexico, Belize and Honduras | All areas inhabited by Yucatán vireo which are not part of the Cayman Islands Secondary area and are not included within the region's EBAs |
| s008 | Clarión | Clarión Island | The world range of Clarión wren, plus the only breeding site of the non-restricted-range Townsend's shearwater |
| s009 | Swan Islands | between Honduras and Grand Cayman | Inhabited by vitelline warbler, elsewhere found only in the Cayman Islands |
| s010 | North Honduran thorn forests | Inland valleys on the Honduran Atlantic slope | The world range of Honduran emerald |
| s011 | Lake Nicaragua marshes | Marshes on the shorelines of Lake Nicaragua and Lake Managua | The world range of Nicaraguan grackle |
| s012 | Isla de Providencia | In the Caribbean, east of Nicaragua | The only area inhabited by thick-billed vireo which is not included within Caribbean EBAs |
| s013 | San Andrés Island | In the Caribbean, east of Nicaragua | The world range of St Andrés vireo; also present, Jamaican oriole, which is otherwise only found in one EBA (Jamaica), and one other secondary area (s014) |
| s014 | Cayman Islands | In the Caribbean, west of Jamaica | Presence of four restricted-range species, all of which are found in other EBAs (Yucatán vireo, thick-billed vireo, vitelline warbler, Jamaican oriole); also, the extinct Grand Cayman thrush was formerly found here |
| s015 | Netherlands Antilles | In the Caribbean, off the coast of Venezuela | Presence of yellow-shouldered amazon (which is otherwise only found in one South American EBA), and pearly-eyed thrasher, a species found in several Caribbean EBAs. |
| s016 | Trinidad | In the Caribbean, off the coast of Venezuela | The world range of Trinidad piping-guan |
| s017 | Tobago | In the Caribbean, off the north coast of Trinidad | Presence of white-tailed sabrewing, which is otherwise only found in one South American EBA |

== Secondary areas in South America ==
| Birdlife Code | Name | Location | Interest |
| s018 | Lower Rio Magdalena | | |
| s019 | Macarena Mountain | | |
| s020 | Sierra de Chiribiquete | | |
| s021 | Tumaco and Bocagrande Islands | | |
| s022 | Huallaga Valley | | |
| s023 | Upper Inambari valley | | |
| s024 | Lake Titicaca | | |
| s025 | Rio Ji-paraná | | |
| s026 | Rio Guaporé | | |
| s027 | Beni lowlands | | |
| s028 | East Bolivian cerrado | | |
| s029 | Borba | | |
| s030 | Upper Rio Cururu | | |
| s031 | Rio Araguaia | | |
| s032 | Interior Southern Brazil | | |
| s033 | Ceará caatinga and serras | | |
| s034 | Coastal Paraná marshes | | |
| s035 | Coastal Uruguay marshes | | |
| s036 | Salinas Grandes and Ambargasta | | |
| s037 | South Georgia | | |

== Secondary areas in Africa, Europe and the Middle East ==
| Birdlife Code | Name | Location | Interest |
| s038 | St Helena | | |
| s039 | North Algerian Mountains | | |
| s040 | Upper Niger Valley | | |
| s041 | South-west Nigeria | | |
| s042 | Lower Niger Valley | | |
| s043 | Gabon-Cabinda coast | | |
| s044 | West Zaïre and north Angola forests | | |
| s045 | Namibian escarpment | | |
| s046 | Namib desert | | |
| s047 | Karoo | | |
| s048 | Kerguelen and Crozet Islands | | |
| s049 | Isalo massif | | |
| s050 | Ile Sainte-Marie | | |
| s051 | Southern Zambia | | |
| s052 | North-west Zambia | | |
| s053 | Lake Lufira | | |
| s054 | Upemba plains | | |
| s055 | South-west Tanzanian swamps | | |
| s056 | Kilombero floodplain | | |
| s057 | Dry woodlands west of Lake Victoria | | |
| s058 | Kakamega and Nandi forests | | |
| s059 | North Ugandan swamps | | |
| s060 | North-east Uganda | | |
| s061 | North Kenyan short-grass plains | | |
| s062 | Mount Kulal | | |
| s063 | Northern Ethiopia | | |
| s064 | North-west Somalia | | |
| s065 | Djibouti juniper forests | | |
| s066 | North-east Sudan | | |
| s067 | Levantine mountains | | |
| s068 | Corsican mountains | | |
| s069 | Azores | | |
| s070 | Caledonian pine forest | | |

== Secondary Areas in Continental Asia ==
| Birdlife Code | Name | Location | Interest |
| s071 | | | |
| s072 | | | |
| s073 | | | |
| s074 | | | |
| s075 | Central Indian Forests | India | Forest owlet |
| s076 | | | |
| s077 | | | |
| s078 | | | |
| s079 | | | |
| s080 | | | |
| s081 | | | |
| s082 | | | |
| s083 | | | |
| s084 | | | |
| s085 | | | |
| s086 | | | |
| s087 | | | |
| s088 | | | |
| s089 | | | |
| s090 | | | |
| s091 | | | |
| s092 | | | |
| s093 | | | |

== Secondary Areas in South-east Asian islands, New Guinea and Australia ==
| Birdlife Code | Name | Location | Interest |
| s094 | | | |
| s095 | Tablas, Romblon e Sibuyan | Philippines | |
| s096 | Siquijor | Philippines | |
| s097 | | | |
| s098 | Sabah lowlands | Borneo | |
| s099 | Kalimantan lowland | Borneo | |
| s100 | Bornean costal zone | Borneo | |
| s101 | | | |
| s102 | | | |
| s103 | | | |
| s104 | | | |
| s105 | | | |
| s106 | Mentawai Islands | Indonesia | |
| s107 | | | |
| s108 | | | |
| s109 | | | |
| s110 | Salayar and Bonerate Islands | Indonesia | |
| s111 | | | |
| s112 | Aru Islands | Indonesia | |
| s113 | Yapen | Indonesia | |
| s114 | | | |
| s115 | | | |
| s116 | | | |
| s117 | | | |
| s118 | | | |
| s119 | | | |
| s120 | | | |
| s121 | | | |

== Secondary Areas in the Pacific Islands region ==
| Birdlife Code | Name | Location | Interest |
| s122 | Wake Island | | |
| s123 | Marshall Islands | | |
| s124 | Nauru | | |
| s125 | Gilbert Islands | | |
| s126 | Ontong Java Atoll | | |
| s127 | Rotuma | | |
| s128 | Wallis and Futuna | | |
| s129 | Niuafo'ou | | |
| s130 | Tonga | | |
| s131 | Niue | | |
| s132 | Snares Islands and Stewart Island islets | | |
| s133 | Antipodes Islands | | |
| s134 | Northern Line Islands | | |
| s135 | Aitutaki | | |
| s136 | Rapa Iti | | |
| s137 | Pitcairn | | |
| s138 | Nīhoa | | |

== See also ==
- List of Endemic Bird Areas of the World
