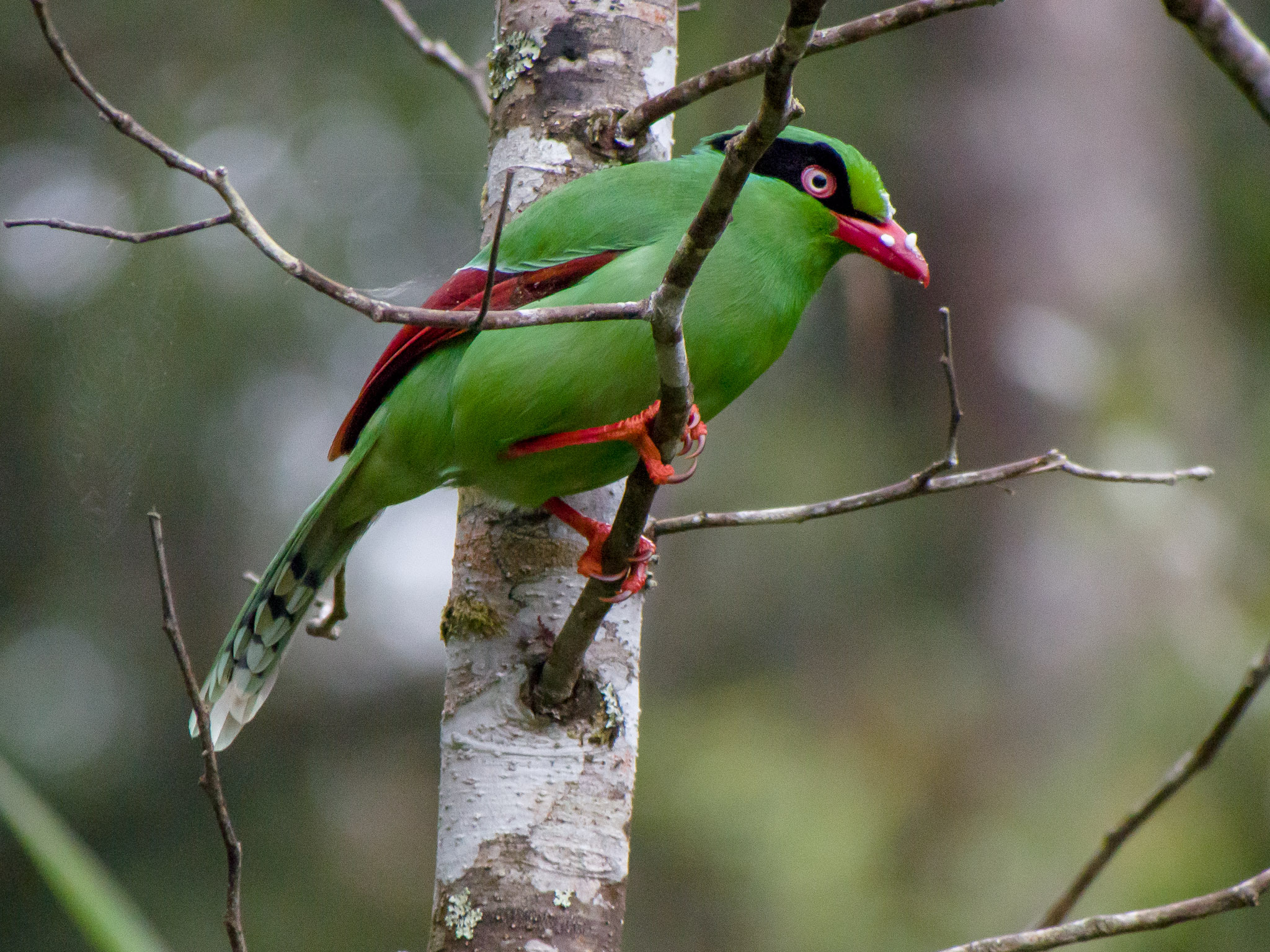
- In Sabah, Malaysia

Conservation status
- Least Concern (IUCN 3.1)

Scientific classification
- Kingdom: Animalia
- Phylum: Chordata
- Class: Aves
- Order: Passeriformes
- Family: Corvidae
- Genus: Cissa
- Species: C. jefferyi

Binomial name
- Cissa jefferyi Sharpe, 1888

= Bornean green magpie =

Species of bird

The Bornean green magpie (Cissa jefferyi) is a passerine bird in the crow family, Corvidae. It is endemic to montane forests on the southeast Asian island of Borneo. It was formerly included as a subspecies of the Javan green magpie, but under the common name Short-tailed Green Magpie. Uniquely among the green magpies, the Bornean green magpie has whitish eyes (dark reddish-brown in the other species).

It dwells in thick vegetation in the mid and upper storeys of forests, and makes only short flights.

The Bornean green magpie builds an open cup nest of sticks in the canopy. The Bornean green magpie has a rather harsh call, a reminder that they are passerine birds which belong to the crow family Corvidae.

== Gallery ==
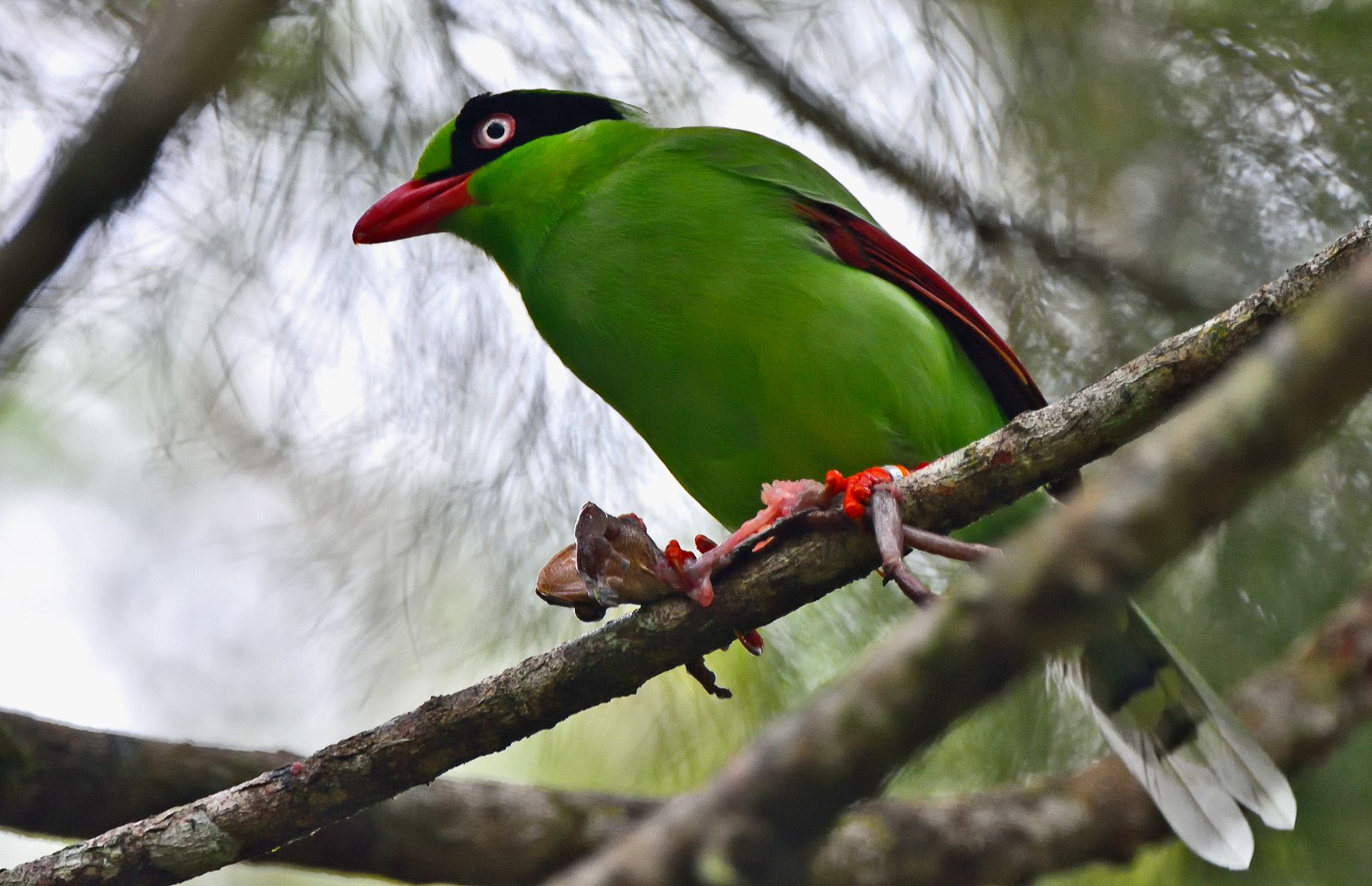
Photo taken near Liwagu Restaurant, Kinabalu Park
