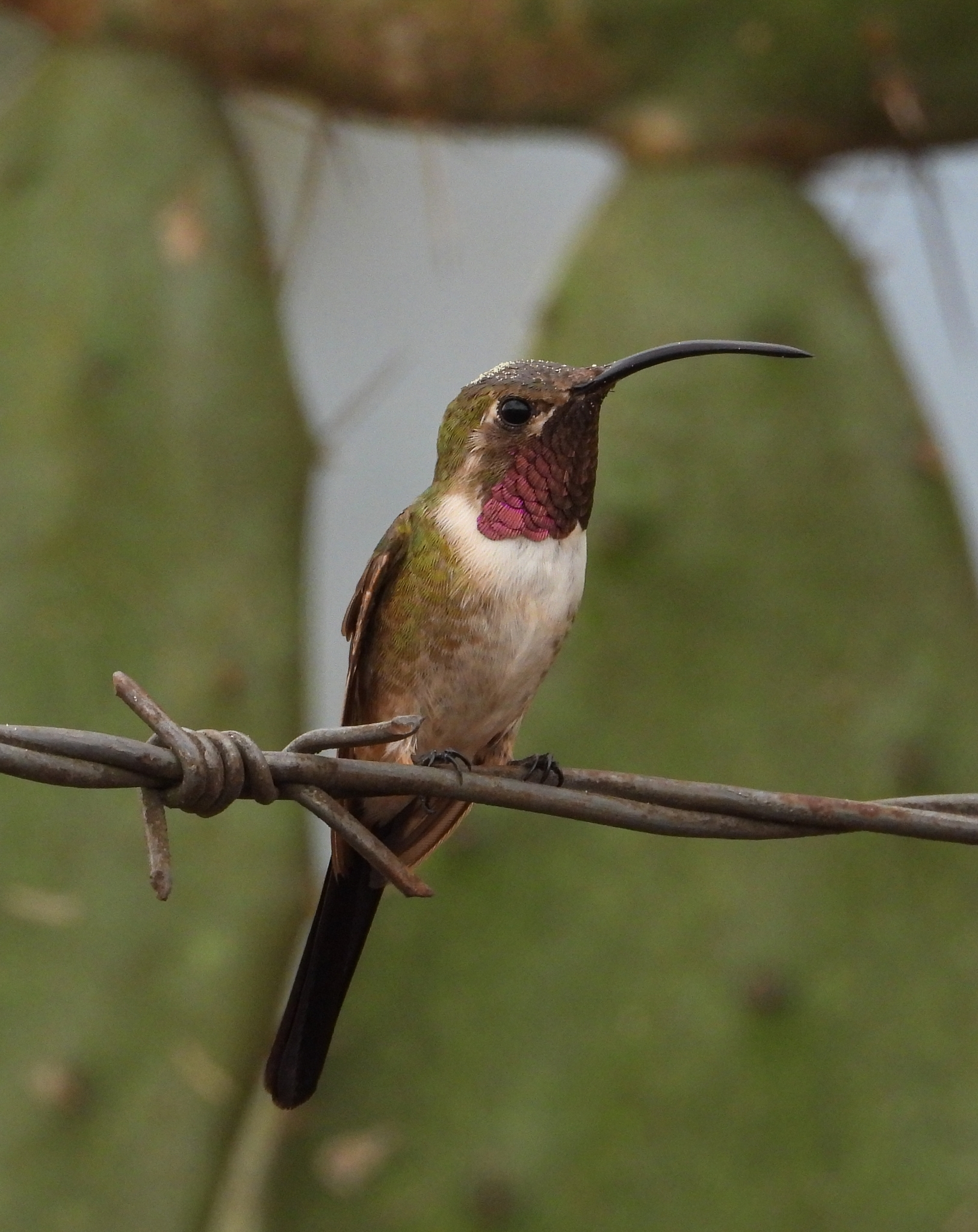

Conservation status
- Near Threatened (IUCN 3.1)
- CITES Appendix II

Scientific classification
- Kingdom: Animalia
- Phylum: Chordata
- Class: Aves
- Order: Apodiformes
- Family: Trochilidae
- Genus: Doricha
- Species: D. eliza

Binomial name
- Doricha eliza (Lesson, RP & Delattre, 1839)
- Range of Doricha eliza

= Mexican sheartail =

Species of bird

The Mexican sheartail (Doricha eliza) is a species of hummingbird in the family Trochilidae. It is endemic to Mexico.

== Description ==
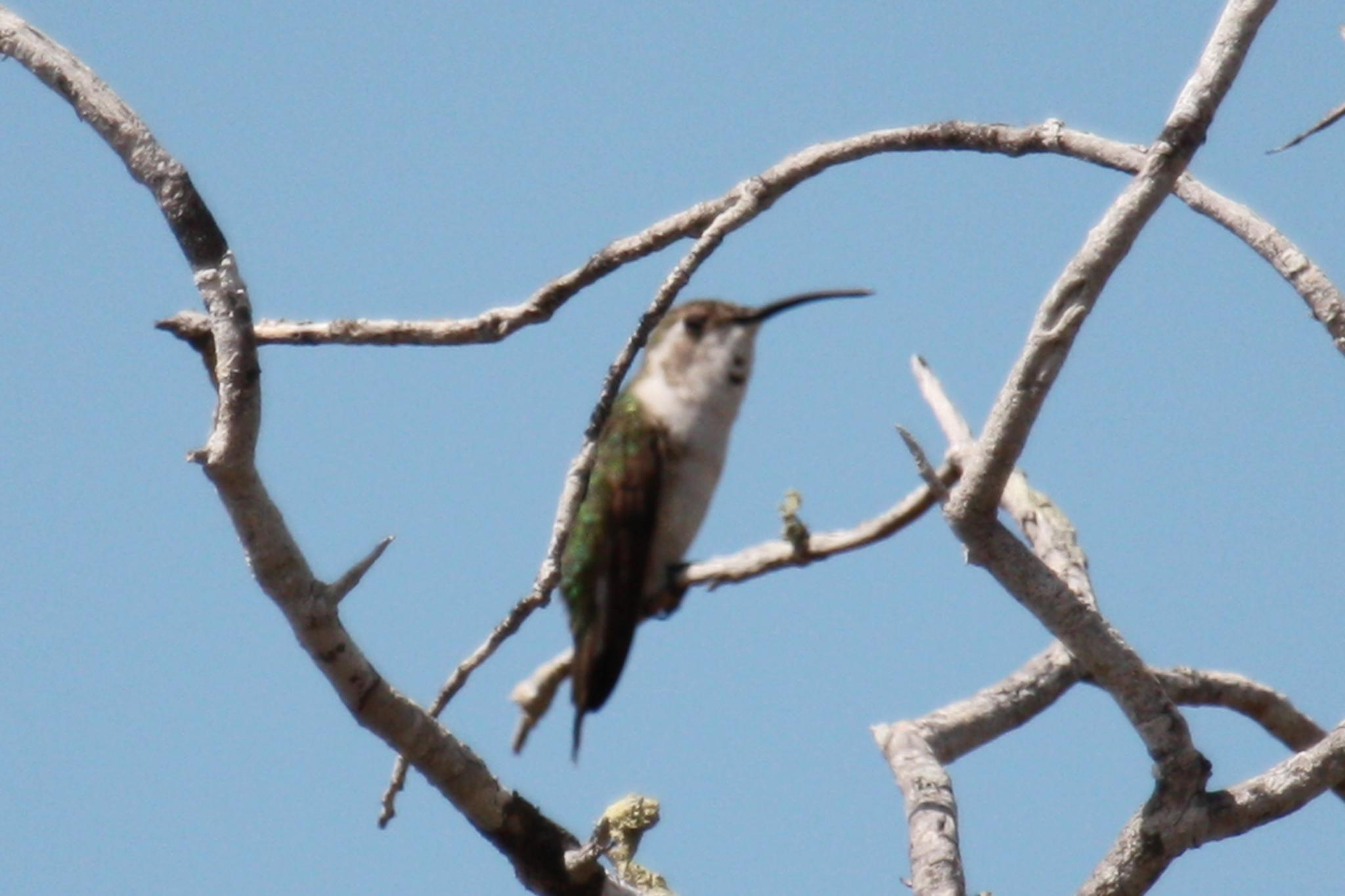
female bird

This is a tiny bird, weighing only 2.4 to 2.6 g (0.085 to 0.092 oz). All Mexican sheartails have a long, curved and black bill, a dull green crown and bronzy-green nape and upper parts. Males and females are sexually dimorphic. The male, which is 9 to 10 centimetres (3.5 to 3.9 in) long including the tail, has a white line behind the eye and a pink-purple throat with a white band below. His underparts are dull green, being clearer on median belly and feathers covering his undertail. The male's tail is long and deeply forked, usually held closed in repose. His inner tail are feathers green, the rest being black with cinnamon inner margins. Females, at 8.5 to 9 cm (3.3 to 3.5 in), have a whitish face with a blackish stripe behind the eye. Her throat, chest and belly are whitish with cinnamon tinges on the sides. The female has a shorter forked tail, the outer feathers of which are reddish with a subterminal black band and white tips. Immatures are similar to females. Females are also far more commonly seen than males, typically outnumbering the latter 5 to 1.

== Distribution and habitat ==
It is found only in Mexico where it lives in two disjunct populations, one in the center of Veracruz and the other in the northern coastal area of the Yucatan Peninsula. Its natural habitats are subtropical or tropical dry forest, subtropical or tropical dry shrubland, mangroves, rural gardens and urban areas. A specific example of the mangrove habitat is the Petenes mangroves ecoregion in the Yucatán Peninsula. The species is threatened by habitat loss.

== Behaviour ==
The Mexican sheartail feeds on nectar from flowers and has been seen visiting Ipomoea, Justicia and Helicteres guazumaefolia. It also sometimes consumes small arthropods. In Veracruz, breeding takes place from May onwards and in Yucatán, between August and April. The tiny cup-shaped nest is made of lichens, spiders webs and the seeds of daisy family plants. Two eggs are laid and newly fledged young have been reported from Yucatán in February and March.

== Status ==
The Mexican sheartail has a small range divided into parts. There are estimated to be fewer than 2500 individuals in the Veracruz population and somewhere between 6,000 and 10,000 in the Yucatán coastal strip. Both are suffering habitat degradation, the former from agricultural and residential development and the latter from development related to tourism. It is likely that the population of these birds is in decline and the IUCN have listed this species as being "Near Threatened".
