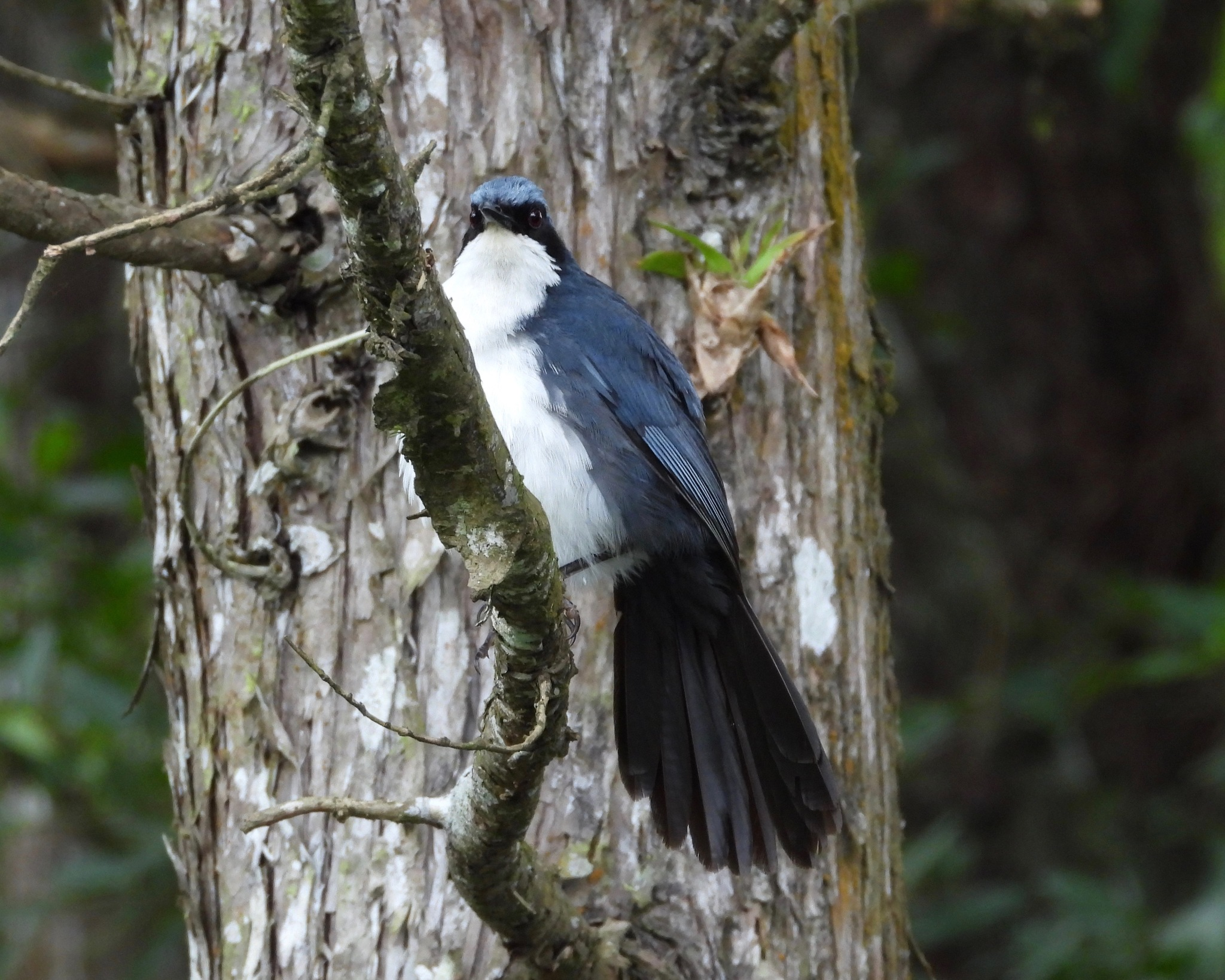

Conservation status
- Least Concern (IUCN 3.1)

Scientific classification
- Kingdom: Animalia
- Phylum: Chordata
- Class: Aves
- Order: Passeriformes
- Family: Mimidae
- Genus: Melanotis
- Species: M. hypoleucus

Binomial name
- Melanotis hypoleucus Hartlaub, 1852

= Blue-and-white mockingbird =

Species of bird

The blue-and-white mockingbird (Melanotis hypoleucus) is a species of bird in the family Mimidae. It is found in El Salvador, Guatemala, Honduras, and Mexico.

== Taxonomy and systematics ==
The blue-and-white mockingbird is monotypic. It and the blue mockingbird (Melanotis caerulescens) are the only species in their genus.

== Description ==
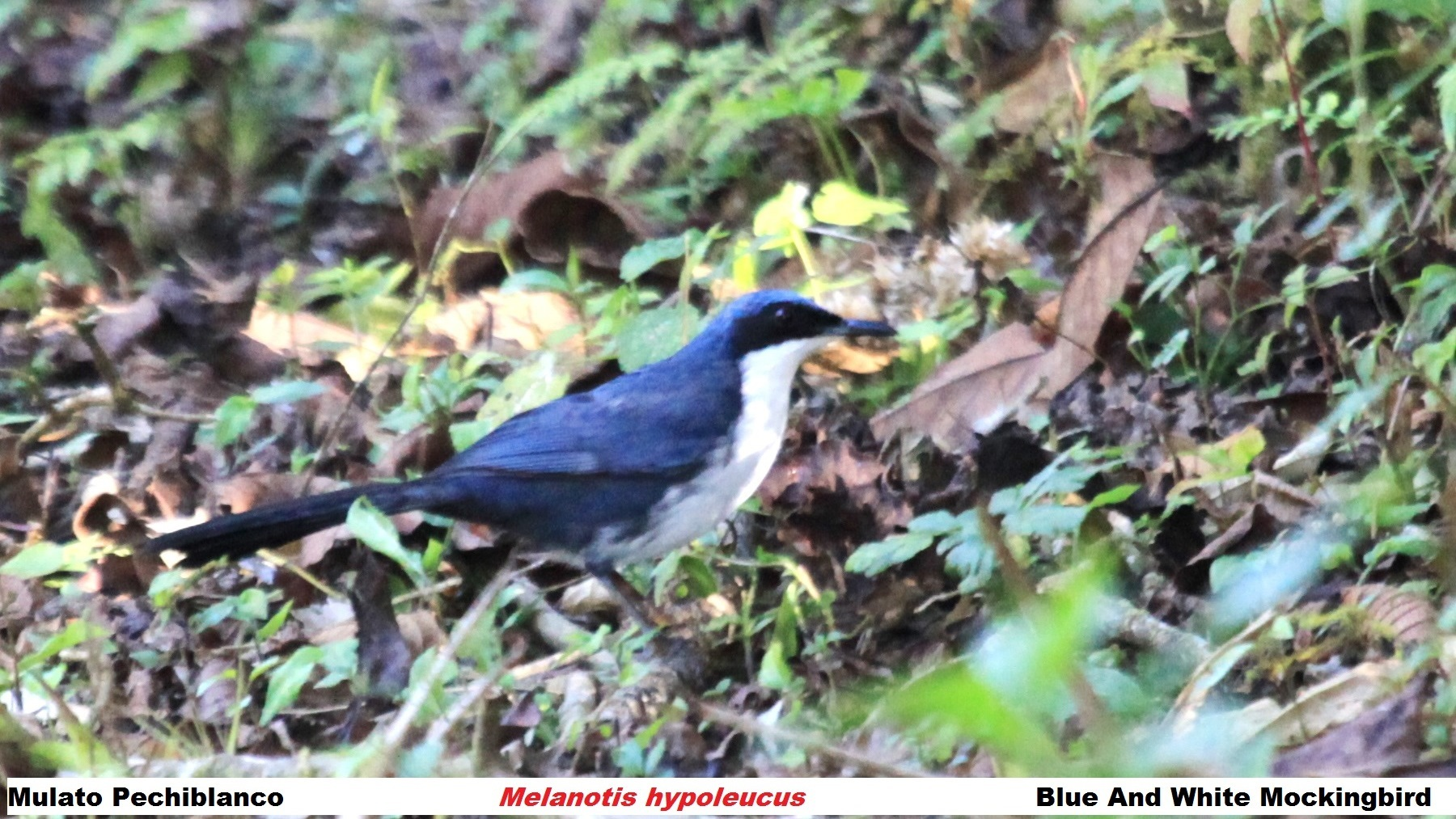
photograph from Mexico

The blue-and-white mockingbird is 24.2 to 28 cm (9.5 to 11.0 in) long; 20 specimens had a mean mass of 68 g (2.4 oz). The adults' upperparts are a dull slate blue that is slightly brighter on the crown. The wings and tail are slaty black. A conspicuous black "mask" covers from the lores past the eye. The underparts are white darkening to bluish or slate gray on the flanks and vent area. The juvenile has a similar pattern but its upperparts are dull slaty gray instead of blue.

== Distribution and habitat ==
The blue-and-white mockingbird is a year round resident of Mexico from south of the Isthmus of Tehuantepec through Guatemala to El Salvador and southern Honduras. It inhabits a variety of landscapes including the edges of humid evergreen forest, pine-oak forest, second growth, and humid and semi-arid scrublands. In elevation it ranges between 900 and 3,000 m (3,000 and 9,800 ft).

== Behavior ==
=== Feeding ===
The blue-and-white mockingbird primarily forages on the ground, by sweeping aside leaf litter with its bill. Though its diet has not been fully documented, its primary food appears to be invertebrates and it also eats small fruits.

=== Breeding ===
The blue-and-white mockingbird's breeding season extends at least from May to August. Females build the nest, a shallow cup of fibrous roots on top of a platform of sticks. It is placed in dense thickets or small trees. The clutch size is two. The female incubates the eggs and broods the nestlings but both sexes feed them.

=== Vocalization ===
The blue-and-white mockingbird's song has been described as "an amazing medley of bird notes...[including] a rapid series of monosyllables, now a shrill squeak, now a whistle, now a guttural croak...certainly not musical or harmonious". It also has a wide variety of calls.

== Status ==
The IUCN has assessed the blue-and-white mockingbird as being of Least Concern. Though it has a large geographic range, its population has not been quantified and "[h]abitat destruction or degradation may jeopardize the viability of populations".
