= List of endemic bird areas of the world =

The following is a list of endemic bird areas of the world, as defined by Birdlife International – see main article (Endemic Bird Area).

== North and Central America ==
EBA Number	Earlier unique code(s)	Name
001	A01	California
002	A03	Baja California
003	A02	Guadalupe Island
004	A10	Socorro Island
005	A05	North-west Mexican Pacific slope
006	A04	Sierra Madre Occidental and trans-Mexican range
007	A08	Central Mexican marshes
008	A11 (part), A27	Balsas region and interior Oaxaca
009	A12	Sierra Madre del Sur
010	A06	Northern Sierra Madre Oriental
011	A07	North-east Mexican Gulf slope
012	A11 (part)	Southern Sierra Madre Oriental
013	A30	Los Tuxtlas and Uxpanapa
014	A13	Isthmus of Tehuantepec
015	A09 (part)	Yucatán Peninsula coastal scrub
016	A09 (part), A29	Cozumel Island
017	A15	North Central American Pacific slope
018	A14	North Central American highlands
019	A16	Central American Caribbean slope
020	A18	Costa Rica and Panama highlands
021	A17	South Central American Pacific slope
022	A21	Cocos Island
023	A19	Darién lowlands
024	A20	Darién highlands
025	A22 (part)	Cuba
026	A22 (part), A28	Bahamas
027	A23	Jamaica
028	A24	Hispaniola
029	A25	Puerto Rico and the Virgin Islands
030	A26	Lesser Antilles

== South America ==
EBA Number	Earlier unique code(s)	Name
031	B16	Galápagos Islands
032	B03	Caripe – Paria region
033	B04	Cordillera de la Costa Central
034	B06	Cordillera de Mérida
035	B07	Caribbean Colombia and Venezuela
036	B08	Santa Marta mountains
037	B09	Nechí lowlands
038	B10	Colombia East Andes
039	B13	Colombian inter-Andean valleys
040	B12	Colombian inter-Andean slopes
041	B14, B15	Chocó
042	B17 (part)	Northern Central Andes
043	B17 (part), B21 (part), B60	Central Andean páramo
044	B18	Ecuador-Peru East Andes
045	B20, B26	Tumbesian region
046	B21 (part)	Southern Central Andes
047	B24	Andean ridge-top forests
048	B22	Marañón valley
049	B25	Northeast Peruvian cordilleras
050	B28	Junín puna
051	B27, B31	Peruvian high Andes
052	B32	Peru-Chile Pacific slope
053	B29	Peruvian East Andean foothills
054	B34 (part)	Bolivian and Peruvian lower yungas
055	B33	Bolivian and Peruvian upper yungas
056	B35, B37	High Andes of Bolivia and Argentina
057	B34 (part), B57	Argentine and south Bolivian yungas
058	B39	Sierras Centrales of Argentina
059	B40	Juan Fernández Islands
060	B41 (part)	Central Chile (Chilean matorral)
061	B41 (part), B58	Chilean temperate forests (Valdivian temperate forests)
062	B42	Southern Patagonia
063	B56	Rio Branco gallery forest
064	B02	Tepuis
065	B11	Orinoco-Negro white-sand forests (Rio Negro campinarana)
066	B19, B23	Upper Amazon-Napo forests
067	B43	Amazon flooded forests
068	B30	South-east Peruvian lowlands
069	B45	Fernando de Noronha
070	B46	North-east Brazilian caatinga
071	B47	Atlantic slope of Alagoas and Pernambuco (Pernambuco coastal forests)
072	B48	Deciduous forests of Bahia
073	B50	Central Brazilian hills and tablelands
074	B49	Deciduous forests of Minas Gerais and Goiás
075	B51, B52	Atlantic forest lowlands
076	B53, B54	Atlantic forest mountains
077	B55	Argentine Mesopotamian grasslands

== Africa, Europe and the Middle East ==
EBA Number	Earlier unique code(s)	Name
078	C02	Cape Verde Islands
079	C09 (part)	Tristan Islands
080	C09 (part), C47	Gough Island
081	C48	Annobón
082	C07	São Tomé
083	C06	Príncipe
084	C03	Upper Guinea forests
085	C05	Cameroon and Gabon lowlands
086	C04	Cameroon mountains
087	C08	Western Angola
088	C29	Cape fynbos
089	C46	South African forests
090	C44	Lesotho Highlands
091	C28	South African grasslands
092	C27	South-east African coast
093	C34	West Malagasy dry forests
094	C35	East Malagasy wet forests
095	C36	East Malagasy wetlands
096	C37	West Malagasy wetlands
097	C38	South Malagasy spiny forests
098	C32, C33	Comoro Islands
099	C31	Aldabra
100	C30	Granitic Seychelles
101	C39	Réunion
102	C40	Mauritius
103	C41	Rodrigues
104	C26	Eastern Zimbabwe mountains
105	C24	Tanzania – Malawi mountains
106	C20	Albertine Rift Mountains
107	C19	Eastern Zaïre lowlands
108	C22	Serengeti plains
109	C21	Kenyan mountains
110	C45	Pemba
111	C23	East African coastal forests
112	C18	Central Somali coast
113	C43	Jubba and Shabeelle valleys
114	C17	South Ethiopian Highlands
115	C16	Central Ethiopian Highlands
116	C15	North Somali mountains
117	C14	Socotra
118	C13	South-west Arabian mountains
119	C12	Mesopotamian marshes
120	C01	Madeira and the Canary Islands
121	C11	Cyprus
122	C10	Caucasus

== Continental Asia ==
EBA Number	Earlier unique code(s)	Name
123		Western Ghats
124 c2		Sri Lanka
125		Andaman Islands
126		Nicobar Islands
127		Taklimakan Desert
128		Western Himalayas
129		Central Himalayas
130		Eastern Himalayas
131		Assam plains
132		Irrawaddy plains
133		Southern Tibet
134		Eastern Tibet
135		Qinghai mountains
136		Shanxi mountains
137		Central Sichuan mountains
138		West Sichuan mountains
139		Yunnan mountains
140		Chinese subtropical forests
141		South-east Chinese mountains
142		Hainan
143		Annamese lowlands
144		South Vietnamese lowlands
145		Da Lat Plateau
146		Izu Islands
147		Ogasawara Islands
148		Nansei Shoto
149		Taiwan

== South-east Asian islands, New Guinea and Australia ==
EBA Number	Earlier unique code(s)	Name
150		Mindoro
151		Luzon
152		Negros and Panay
153		Cebu
154		Mindanao and the Eastern Visayas
155		Sulu archipelago
156		Palawan
157		Bornean mountains
158		Sumatra and Peninsular Malaysia
159		Enggano
160		Java and Bali forests
161		Javan coastal zone
162		Northern Nusa Tenggara
163		Sumba
164		Timor and Wetar
165		Banda Sea islands
166		Sulawesi
167		Sangihe and Talaud
168		Banggai and Sula Islands
169		Buru
170		Seram
171		Northern Maluku
172		West Papuan lowlands
173		West Papuan highlands
174		Geelvink Islands
175		North Papuan mountains
176		Northern Papuan lowlands
177		Adelbert and Huon ranges
178		Central Papuan mountains
179		South Papuan lowlands
180		Trans-Fly
181		Cape York
182		Queensland wet tropics
183		Eastern Australia
184		South-east Australia
185		Tasmania
186		Southwest Australia
187		North West Australia
188		Christmas Island

== Pacific Ocean islands ==
EBA Number	Earlier unique code(s)	Name
189		Mariana Islands
190		Palau
191		Yap Islands
192		East Caroline Islands
193		Admiralty Islands
194		St Matthias Islands
195		New Britain and New Ireland
196		D'Entrecasteaux and Trobriand Islands
197		Louisiade Archipelago
198		Solomon group
199		Rennell and Bellona
200		Vanuatu and Temotu
201		New Caledonia
202		Fiji
203		Samoan Islands
204		Lord Howe Island
205		Norfolk Island
206		North Island of New Zealand
207		South Island of New Zealand
208		Auckland Islands
209		Chatham Islands
210		Southern Cook Islands
211		Rimatara
212		Marquesas Islands
213		Society Islands
214		Tuamotu archipelago
215		Henderson Island
216		Laysan Island
217		Central Hawaiian Islands
218		Hawai'i

== See also ==
- List of secondary endemic bird areas of the world
