= Endemic Bird Area =

Land deemed important for bird conservation

An Endemic Bird Area (EBA) is an area of land identified by BirdLife International as being important for habitat-based bird conservation because it contains the habitats of restricted-range bird species (see below for definition), which are thereby endemic to them. An EBA is formed where the distributions of two or more such restricted-range species overlap. Using this guideline, 218 EBAs were identified when Birdlife International established its Biodiversity project in 1987. A secondary EBA comprises the range of only one restricted-range species, or an area which is only the partial breeding range of a range-restricted species.

EBAs contain about 93% of the world's restricted-range bird species, as well as support many more widespread species. Half the restricted-range species are threatened or near-threatened, with the other half especially vulnerable to the loss or degradation of their habitats because of the small size of their ranges. Most EBAs are also important for the conservation of other animals and of plants. Although they cover less than 5% of the world's land surface, their biological richness makes them high priorities for ecosystem conservation. The natural habitat of most EBAs is forest, especially tropical lowland forest and highland cloud forest, often comprising islands or mountain ranges, and varying in size from a few square kilometres to over 100,000 km^{2}. Some 77% of EBAs lie in the tropics and subtropics.

== Restricted-range bird species ==
A restricted-range bird species is a term coined by BirdLife International in conjunction with the identification of Endemic Bird Areas. It is defined as a landbird (i.e. not a seabird) species which is estimated to have had a breeding range of not more than 50,000 km^{2} since 1800. It includes birds which have become extinct which qualify on the range criterion. It does not include birds which, although they meet the range criterion today, were historically (since 1800) more widespread.

== See also ==
- Important Bird Area
- Lists of endemic birds
- List of endemic bird areas of the world
- List of secondary endemic bird areas of the world
