= Tropical pewee =

Tropical pewee has been split into three species:

- Northern tropical pewee, Contopus bogotensis
- Southern tropical pewee, Contopus cinereus
- Tumbes pewee, Contopus punensis
