= Greater Antillean pewee =

The Greater Antillean pewee has been split into three species:

- Cuban pewee, Contopus caribaeus
- Hispaniolan pewee, Contopus hispaniolensis
- Jamaican pewee, Contopus pallidus
