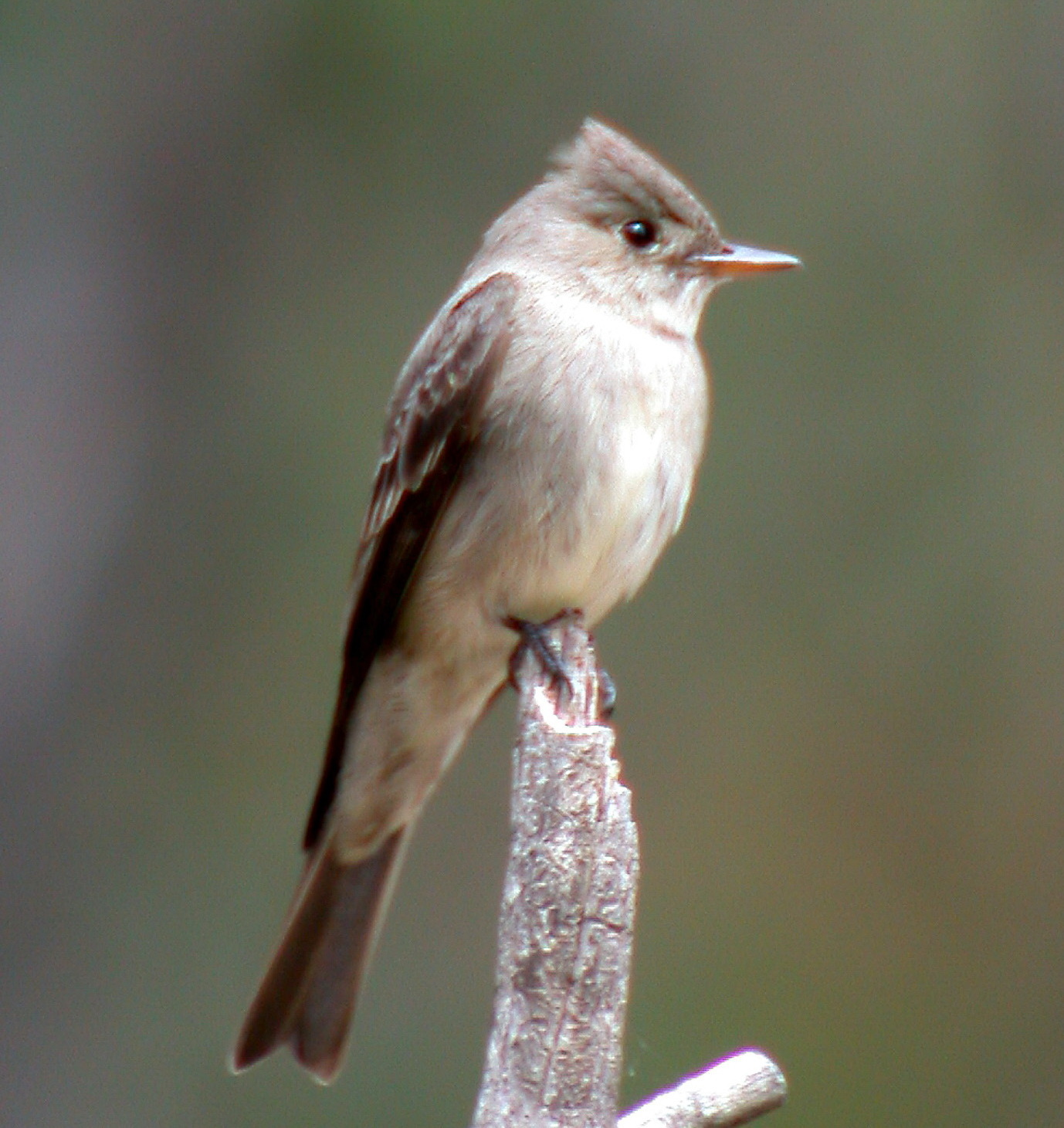

Conservation status
- Least Concern (IUCN 3.1)

Scientific classification
- Kingdom: Animalia
- Phylum: Chordata
- Class: Aves
- Order: Passeriformes
- Family: Tyrannidae
- Genus: Contopus
- Species: C. pertinax

Binomial name
- Contopus pertinax Cabanis & Heine, 1860
- Breeding Year-round

= Greater pewee =

Species of bird

The greater pewee (Contopus pertinax), formerly known as Coues's flycatcher, is a passerine bird in the family Tyrannidae, the tyrant flycatchers. It is found from Arizona and New Mexico to Nicaragua.

== Taxonomy and systematics ==
The greater pewee has two subspecies, the nominate C. p. pertinax (Cabanis & Heine, 1860) and C. p. minor (Miller, W & Griscom, 1925). The greater pewee, dark pewee (C. lugubris) and smoke-colored pewee (C. fumigatus) form a superspecies.

== Description ==
The greater pewee is 18 to 20 cm (7.1 to 7.9 in) long and weighs about 22 to 36 g (0.78 to 1.3 oz). The sexes have the same plumage with a spiky crest. Subspecies C. p. minor is smaller than the nominate but has essentially the same plumage. Adults have a plain olive-gray head and upperparts, with pale lores and a slightly lighter face than the rest of the head. Their wings are dusky grayish brown with grayish olive ends on the coverts that show as two faint wing bars. They have pale grayish edges on their secondaries. Their tail is dusky grayish brown. Their chin is dull whitish and their throat and sides are olive-gray with a buffy yellowish tinge. The center of their breast, their belly, and their undertail coverts are buffy. Their plumage fades with wear, becoming less olive. Both subspecies have a brown iris, a dusky brown to almost black maxilla, a yellowish to orange mandible, and dusky brown to blackish legs and feet.

== Distribution and habitat ==
The greater pewee has a disjunct distribution, with river valleys and lowlands separating some populations. The nominate subspecies is the more northerly of the two. It ranges from central and southeastern Arizona and southwestern New Mexico in the United States south through western and southern Mexico to the Isthmus of Tehuantepec and in migration further south into Guatemala. Subspecies C. p. minor is found from east of the Isthmus of Tehuantepec intermittently through Guatemala, Belize, El Salvador, and Honduras into far north-central Nicaragua. The nominate subspecies occurs as a vagrant in California and migrates in small numbers through western Texas.

The greater pewee primarily inhabits pine and pine-oak forest in the subtropical and temperate zones. In migration and to some extent during the non-breeding season it also occurs in deciduous riparian forest within pine and pine-oak forest but not within more open areas. In elevation it ranges between 900 and 3,400 m (3,000 and 11,200 ft) overall. In the northern part of its range it mostly is found between 2,100 and 3,000 m (6,900 and 9,800 ft) and in Oaxaca between 1,360 and 2,575 m (4,500 and 8,400 ft). South of Mexico it mostly occurs between 1,300 and 3,350 m (4,300 and 11,000 ft) but is found as low as 400 m (1,300 ft).

== Behavior ==
=== Movement ===
The greater pewee breeds throughout its range. The Arizona, New Mexico, and northern Mexican populations are mostly migratory, moving south into central Mexico and slightly into Guatemala. Some individuals remain in those northern areas in the non-breeding season. Within its Mexican year-round range many individuals move to somewhat lower elevations in the non-breeding season. The species is non-migratory in northern Central America.

=== Feeding ===
The greater pewee feeds mostly on flying insects and during the non-breeding season adds other insects and some berries to its diet. It sits erect near a treetop or high up in an edge tree, typically on a dead branch, and captures prey in mid-air with sallies from it ("hawking"). It usually returns to the same perch after a sally. It often accompanies mixed-species feeding flocks while they pass through its territory.

=== Breeding ===
The greater pewee breeds from early May to late July. Its nest is an open cup made mostly from grasses, bark shreds, and pine needles held together and in a branch fork with spider silk. It is usually placed high up in a conifer tree. Pairs gather nesting material from the ground, often while hovering. The clutch is usually three or four eggs that are dull white to creamy with small brown spots. Females alone are believed to incubate; the incubation period appears to be about eight days. The time to fledging is not known. Both parents provision nestlings.

=== Vocalization ===
The two subspecies of the greater pewee have different songs. That of the nominate subspecies is "a plaintive Ho-say ma-ree-ah" that gives rise to its Mexican Spanish name "papamoscas José María". There is some variation in the number of ho-say notes. The song of subspecies C. p. minor is "fred-rick fear". Both subspecies calls are variations on pip-pip-pip, repeated peeps or beep-beep, or wic-wic-wic. Males alone are thought to sing. Most singing is in the breeding season, and is done from dawn throughout the day from the end of a dead branch "at mid- to upper height" in a tall conifer.

== Status ==
The IUCN has assessed the greater pewee as being of Least Concern. It has an extremely large range; its population of about two million mature individuals is believed to be decreasing. No immediate threats have been identified. It is considered uncommon in the U.S. and fairly common in northern Central America. "Because Greater Pewee nests in large conifers, removal of large trees probably detrimental, but needs formal study."
