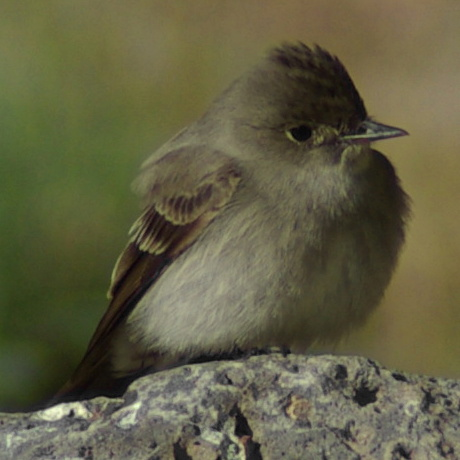
- Western wood pewee (Contopus sordidulus)

Scientific classification
- Kingdom: Animalia
- Phylum: Chordata
- Class: Aves
- Order: Passeriformes
- Family: Tyrannidae
- Genus: Contopus; Cabanis, 1855

Type species
- Muscicapa virens Linnaeus, 1766

Species
- See text.

= Pewee =

Pewees

Genus of birds

The pewees are a genus, Contopus, of small to medium-sized insect-eating birds in the tyrant flycatcher family Tyrannidae.

These birds are known as pewees, from the call of one of the more common members of this vocal group. They are generally charcoal-grey birds with wing bars that live in wooded areas.

== Taxonomy ==
The genus Contopus was introduced by the German ornithologist Jean Cabanis in 1855 with Muscicapa virens Linnaeus, the eastern wood pewee, as the type species. The name of the genus combines the Ancient Greek words kontos "pole" or "shaft" and pous "foot". A large molecular phylogenetic study of the Tyrannidae that was published in 2020 found that Contopus was sister to the genus Mitrephanes containing the two tufted flycatchers.

The genus contains 16 species:

| Image | Scientific name | Common name | Distribution |
|---|---|---|---|
| | Contopus cooperi | Olive-sided flycatcher | Canada, Alaska and the northeastern and western United States |
| | Contopus pertinax | Greater pewee | central and southern Mexico south through Costa Rica and Nicaragua |
| | Contopus lugubris | Dark pewee | Talamancan montane forests of Costa Rica and western Panama. |
| | Contopus fumigatus | Smoke-colored pewee | Argentina, Bolivia, Brazil, Colombia, Ecuador, Guyana, Peru, and Venezuela |
| | Contopus ochraceus | Ochraceous pewee | Costa Rica and western Panama |
| | Contopus sordidulus | Western wood pewee | western North America |
| | Contopus virens | Eastern wood pewee | Central America and in the Andes region of northern South America. |
| | Contopus cinereus | Southern tropical pewee | southern Brazil and Paraguay south to Argentina. |
| | Contopus bogotensis | Northern tropical pewee | southeastern Mexico to northern South America from northern Colombia to northeastern Brazil. |
| | Contopus punensis | Tumbes pewee | western Ecuador and western Peru. |
| | Contopus albogularis | White-throated pewee | Brazil, French Guiana, and Suriname. |
| | Contopus nigrescens | Blackish pewee | Brazil, Ecuador, Guyana, and Peru. |
| | Contopus caribaeus | Cuban pewee | Cuba and the northern Bahamas. |
| | Contopus hispaniolensis | Hispaniolan pewee | island of Hispaniola in the Caribbean. |
| | Contopus pallidus | Jamaican pewee | Jamaica |
| | Contopus latirostris | Lesser Antillean pewee | Dominica, Guadeloupe, Martinique, Puerto Rico, and Saint Lucia |
