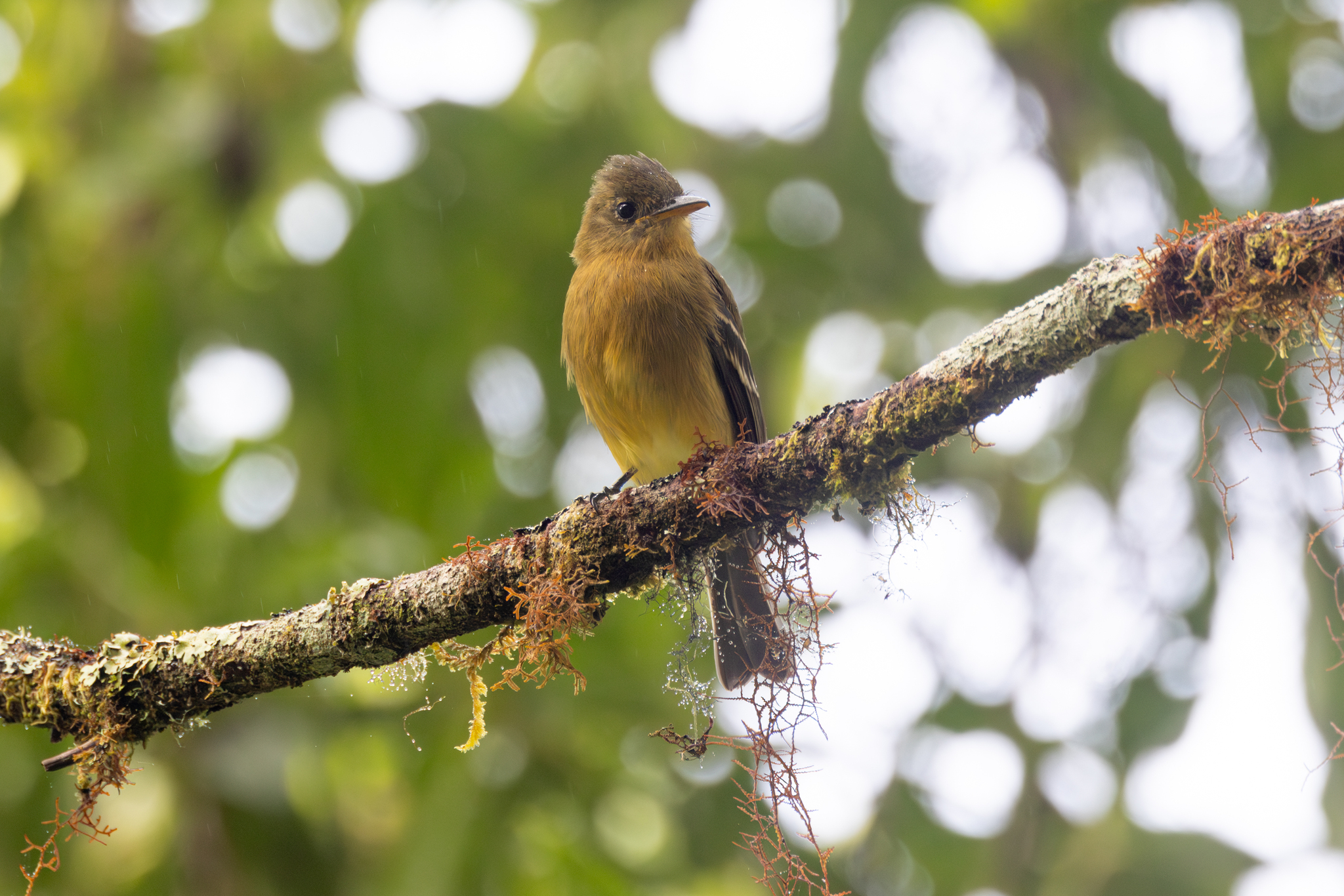

Conservation status
- Least Concern (IUCN 3.1)

Scientific classification
- Kingdom: Animalia
- Phylum: Chordata
- Class: Aves
- Order: Passeriformes
- Family: Tyrannidae
- Genus: Contopus
- Species: C. ochraceus

Binomial name
- Contopus ochraceus Sclater, PL & Salvin, 1869

= Ochraceous pewee =

Species of bird

The ochraceous pewee (Contopus ochraceus) is a species of bird in the family Tyrannidae, the tyrant flycatchers. It is found in Costa Rica and Panama.

== Taxonomy and systematics ==
The ochraceous pewee is monotypic.

== Description ==
The ochraceous pewee is 16.5 to 18 cm (6.5 to 7.1 in) long and weighs about 23 g (0.81 oz). The sexes have the same plumage with a spiky crest. Adults have a dark brownish olive crown and crest. The rest of their head, their nape, and their upperparts are olive. Their wings are blackish with olive-buff, buff, or ochre ends on the coverts that show as two thin wing bars. Their tail is dusky and slightly notched. Their throat is pale yellow, their breast and flanks olive with an ochre wash, and their belly and undertail coverts buffy yellow. Their plumage fades and becomes duller with wear. They have a dark iris, a wide bill with a black maxilla and an orange-yellow mandible, and blackish legs and feet. Juveniles are similar to adults but with brighter ochre wing bars and ochre-buff edges on the lesser coverts.

== Distribution and habitat ==
The ochraceous pewee has a disjunct distribution. One population is found in Costa Rica on Irazú and Turrialba volcanoes in Cartago Province. Another ranges along the Cordillera de Talamanca from Cartago and central San José provinces east very slightly into western Panama's Chiriquí Province. In Chiriquí it is known from a nineteenth century specimen and more recent photographs taken in Cerro Punta. It inhabits evergreen montane oak forest and mature secondary forest in the temperate zone. There it favors areas near streams, forest edges, and openings caused by fallen trees. In elevation it ranges between 2,200 and 3,000 m (7,200 and 9,800 ft).

== Behavior ==
=== Movement ===
The ochraceous pewee is a year-round resident.

=== Feeding ===
The ochraceous pewee feeds mostly on flying insects. It sits erect near a treetop or high up in an edge tree and captures prey in mid-air with sallies from it ("hawking"). It usually returns to the same perch after a sally and "shivers" its tail upon landing. It sometimes accompanies mixed-species feeding flocks while they pass through its territory.

=== Breeding ===
The ochraceous pewee's breeding season includes March but has not been otherwise defined. Its nest is an open cup made from moss placed like a saddle high up on a slender tree limb at the forest edge. The clutch size, incubation period, time to fledging, and details of parental care are not known.

=== Vocalization ===
The ochraceous pewee's song is "a piercing high, thin peeeeyit or peeeeyeeet, first syllable accented". One call is "a sharp and repeated pwit" and another is "pip pip pip".

== Status ==
The IUCN has assessed the ochraceous pewee as being of Least Concern. It has a somewhat restricted range and its estimated population of between 20,000 and 50,000 mature individuals is believed to be stable. No immediate threats have been identified. It is considered rare throughout its range. "Highland forests in this species' range have been extensively destroyed by burning, logging and agricultural conversion [and the] current deforestation rate of c. 3% annually means that forests will soon survive only in protected areas."
