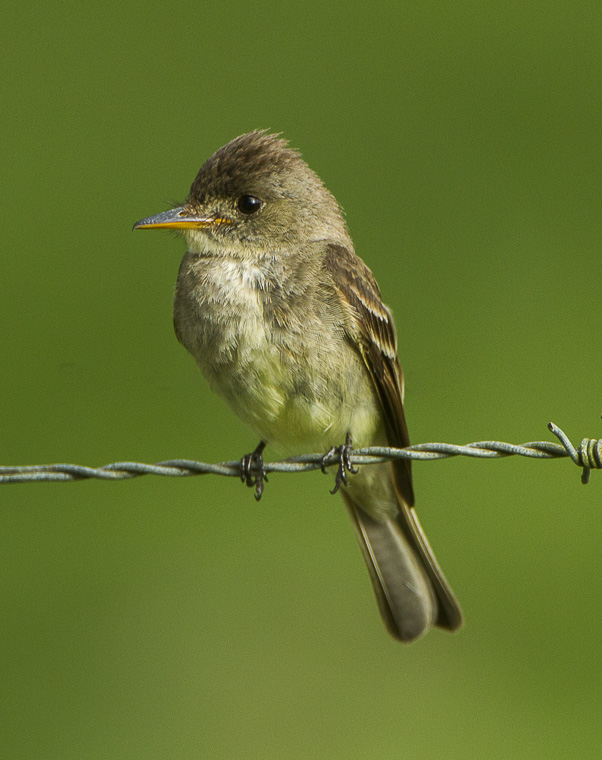

Conservation status
- Least Concern (IUCN 3.1)

Scientific classification
- Kingdom: Animalia
- Phylum: Chordata
- Class: Aves
- Order: Passeriformes
- Family: Tyrannidae
- Genus: Contopus
- Species: C. bogotensis

Binomial name
- Contopus bogotensis (Bonaparte, 1850)

= Northern tropical pewee =

Species of bird

The northern tropical pewee (Contopus bogotensis) is a species of bird in the family Tyrannidae, the tyrant flycatchers. It is found from southeastern Mexico to northern South America.

== Taxonomy and systematics ==
The northern tropical pewee's taxonomy is unsettled. The International Ornithological Committee (IOC), the Clements taxonomy, and BirdLife International's Handbook of the Birds of the World (HBW) assign it these five subspecies:

- C. b. brachytarsus (Sclater, PL, 1859)
- C. b. rhizophorus (Dwight & Griscom, 1924)
- C. b. aithalodes (Wetmore, 1957)
- C. b. bogotensis (Bonaparte, 1850)
- C. b. surinamensis (Penard, FP & Penard, AP, 1910)

The North and South American Classification Committees of the American Ornithological Society treat these five subspecies and three others as the tropical pewee with the binomial Contopus cinereus. In 2016 HBW separated those three as the monotypic western tropical pewee (C. punensis) and the two-subspecies southern tropical pewee (C. cinereus). In 2018 the IOC recognized C. punensis as the tumbes pewee and in 2023 the other two subspecies as the southern tropical pewee. Clements made both splits in 2022 and also uses the name "tumbes pewee".

This article follows the five-subspecies model.

== Description ==
The northern tropical pewee is about 12 to 14 cm (4.7 to 5.5 in) long and weighs about 8 to 14 g (0.28 to 0.49 oz). The sexes have the same plumage. Adults of the nominate subspecies C. b. bogotensis have a dark blackish gray crown with a slight crest, white to grayish white lores, and a thin white eye-ring on an otherwise grayish olive face. Their back is sooty olive-gray and their rump and uppertail coverts brownish olive with a hidden white feather tuft on either side of the rump. Their wings are mostly dusky. The wing's secondaries have white or brownish gray edges at the ends and the median and greater coverts have grayish white to brownish gray tips that show as two thin wing bars. Their tail is olive-gray. Their chin and throat are white, their upper breast white with a gray tinge, their lower breast and belly white to yellowish white, and their undertail coverts pale brown. They have a dark brown iris, a black maxilla, a yellowish or orangey mandible, and blackish legs and feet. Juveniles have browner upperparts than adults with buff to cinnamon-buff edges on the feathers. Their wing coverts have wide pale cinnamon-buff tips. Their chin is brown. They have a blackish brown maxilla and a dusky orange mandible.

The other subspecies of the northern tropical pewee differ from the nominate and each other thus:

- C. b. brachytarsus: paler crown, upperparts, and breast than nominate
- C. b. rhizophorus: more gray than olive upperparts; underparts' yellow tinge only on flanks
- C. b. aithalodes: grayer throat and upper breast than nominate
- C. b. surinamensis: paler gray overall than nominate

== Distribution and habitat ==
The northern tropical pewee has a disjunct distribution. The subspecies are found thus:

- C. b. brachytarsus: from Oaxaca, Veracruz, and Yucatán (including Cozumel) in southern Mexico south through Belize, Guatemala, El Salvador, Honduras, Nicaragua, Costa Rica, and most of Panama including the Pearl Islands to the Darién Gap
- C. b. rhizophorus: Guanacaste Province in northwestern Costa Rica
- C. b. aithalodes: Coiba and Ranchería islands off the coast of western Panama
- C. b. bogotensis: northern Colombia and between the northern Colombian Andes; east across northern Venezuela to the Paria Peninsula; Trinidad; the Bocas Islands between Venezuela and Trinidad; southern Amazonas state in southern Venezuela and adjacent northwestern Brazil
- C. b. surinamensis: from northwestern Bolívar state in east-central Venezuela east across the Guianas to Amapá and Marajó Island in northern Brazil

The northern tropical pewee inhabits a variety of landscapes including dry to moist forest, woodlands, gallery forest, coffee and cacao plantations, shrubby and brushy areas, and mangroves. It tends to favor the edges and clearings of forest rather than its interior. Subspecies C. b. rhizophorus is almost entirely dependent on mangroves. In elevation it ranges from sea level to 1,200 m (3,900 ft) in Mexico. It reaches 1,800 m (5,900 ft) in northern Central America, 1,000 m (3,300 ft) on the Caribbean side and 1,300 m (4,300 ft) on the Pacific side of Costa Rica, 1,500 m (4,900 ft) in Colombia, and 1,900 m (6,200 ft) in Venezuela.

== Behavior ==
=== Movement ===
The northern tropical pewee is mostly a year-round resident. The population across the northern edge of its Mexican range moves south in winter.

=== Feeding ===
The northern tropical pewee apparently feeds only on insects, though details are lacking. It typically forages singly or in pairs. It sits erect on a somewhat open or exposed perch on the forest edge, usually no higher than the forest's mid-level, and captures prey in mid-air with sallies from it ("hawking"). It usually returns to the same perch after a sally and "shivers" its tail upon landing. It rarely joins mixed-species feeding flocks.

=== Breeding ===
The northern tropical pewee's breeding season varies geographically, but with all populations breeding within the February to July span. Males perform a courtship display in which they squat, jump, and flick their wings and tail. The species' nest is a shallow open cup made from lichen, seed down, plant fibers, and green moss lined with softer fibers. The materials are bound together and to a branch with spider silk. Nests have been found between 2 and 14 m (7 and 46 ft) above the ground. The female alone is believed to build the nest. The clutch size is two or three eggs that are dull white with brown and lilac spots. The female alone incubates. The incubation period, time to fledging, and details of parental care are not known.

=== Vocalization ===
The northern tropical pewee's dawn song is a "long series in which short whistles are delivered at a leisurely pace of about one whistle every 2‒3 seconds" and which apparently is the same across its range. Its calls include a "short, rather faint trill trree-re or trree-re-re...a short trilled seerip, tre'e'e'e or tir'r'r'ip...a trilled ti-i-i-i-il or tree-ee-ee-eet [and a] not very musical kyeer,r,r...kyeer,r,r...kyeer,r,r. It typically sings during morning twilight to dawn and calls throughout the day. It vocalizes from a perch on a bare branch in the forest's mid-story.

== Status ==
The IUCN has assessed the northern tropical pewee as being of Least Concern. It has a large range; its population size is not known and is believed to be stable. No immediate threats have been identified. It is considered "fairly common" in northern Central America, "fairly common" on the Caribbean side of Costa Rica, "uncommon" in the central valley and Pacific side of Costa Rica, and "fairly common" in Colombia and Venezuela. It occurs in many protected areas both public and private and is "tolerant of converted and secondary habitats".
