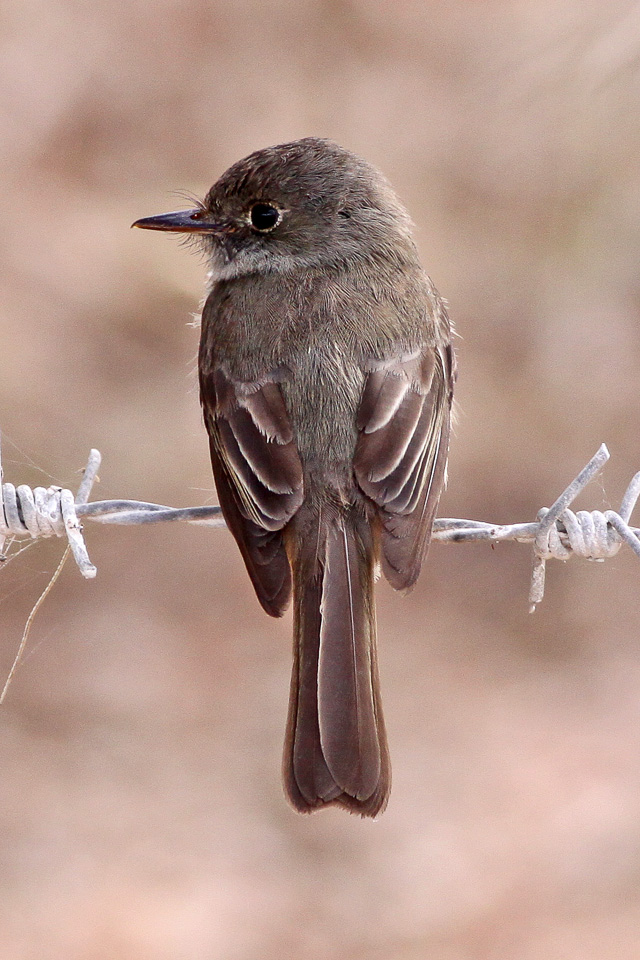
- In Sierra de Bahoruco National Park

Conservation status
- Least Concern (IUCN 3.1)

Scientific classification
- Kingdom: Animalia
- Phylum: Chordata
- Class: Aves
- Order: Passeriformes
- Family: Tyrannidae
- Genus: Contopus
- Species: C. hispaniolensis

Binomial name
- Contopus hispaniolensis (Bryant, 1867)

= Hispaniolan pewee =

Species of bird endemic to Hispaniola

The Hispaniolan pewee (Contopus hispaniolensis) is a species of bird in the family Tyrannidae, the tyrant flycatchers. It is endemic to the Caribbean island of Hispaniola which is shared by the Dominican Republic and Haiti.

== Taxonomy and systematics ==
The Hispaniolan pewee was originally described as Tyrannula carribaea hispaniolensis.

The Hispaniolan pewee and what are now the Cuban pewee (C. caribaeus) and Jamaican pewee (C. pallidus) were formerly treated as one species, the Greater Antillean pewee. They were separated following a study published in 1993 that detailed differences in their vocalizations, plumage, and measurements. The Hispaniolan pewee has two subspecies, the nominate C. h. hispaniolensis (Bryant, 1867) and C. h. tacitus (Wetmore, 1928).

== Description ==
The Hispaniolan pewee is 15 to 16 cm (5.9 to 6.3 in) long and weighs about 11.5 g (0.41 oz). The sexes have the same plumage and the two subspecies are similar to each other. Adults have a grayish olive head and back with a slightly darker crown. Their wings are dusky, sometimes with two faint wing bars. Their tail is dusky. Their throat is gray, their breast gray with an olive wash across it, and their belly and undertail coverts yellowish buff with some gray mixed in. Juveniles have pale fringes on the feathers of the crown, back, and wing coverts. Adults have a dark iris, a wide blackish bill with a paler base to the mandible, and blackish legs and feet.

== Distribution and habitat ==
The nominate subspecies of the Hispaniolan peewee is found across the main island of Hispaniola. Subspecies C. h. tacitus is found on Gonâve Island off the western coast of Haiti. The species has also been documented as a vagrant on Mona Island to the east between Hispaniola and Puerto Rico. It has also been recorded after a hurricane on Providenciales Island in the Turks and Caicos Islands. The species inhabits a variety of wooded landscapes in the tropical and subtropical zones including evergreen and deciduous broadleaf forest, pine forest, shade coffee plantations, and orchards. In elevation it ranges from sea level to 2,000 m (6,600 ft).

== Behavior ==
=== Movement ===
The Hispaniolan pewee is a year-round resident.

=== Feeding ===
The Hispaniolan pewee feeds mostly on insects and includes some fruit in its diet. It sits erect on an exposed perch low to the ground and captures prey in mid-air with sallies from it ("hawking"). It usually returns to the same perch after a sally and flicks its tail upon landing. It has been observed following mixed-species feeding flocks in pine forest.

=== Breeding ===
The Hispaniolan pewee breeds in May and June. The female builds the open cup nest from rootlets, moss, and lichen in a branch fork. It is typically placed between about 3 and 5 m (10 and 15 ft) above the ground. The clutch is two to four eggs which the female incubates. Both parents provision nestlings. The incubation period, time to fledging, and other details of parental care are not known.

=== Vocalization ===
The Hispaniolan pewee's dawn song is "a loud, rapid series of paired notes rising in pitch, shurr, pet-pit, pit-pit, peet-peet" and its call is "purr, pip-pip-pip-pip".

== Status ==
The IUCN has assessed the Hispaniolan pewee as being of Least Concern. It has a large range; its population size is not known and is believed to be decreasing. No immediate threats have been identified. It is considered common. However, less than 2% of Haiti and about 10% of the Dominican Republic remain forested; "forests continue to be destroyed by logging, slash-and-burn agriculture, charcoal production, and replacement with pine plantations". Though the species is found in several existing and proposed protected areas, "lack of funds for protection and management threaten their long-term survival".
