= Tawny tufted flycatcher =

- In Sinaloa, Mexico

Conservation status
- Least Concern (IUCN 3.1)

Scientific classification
- Kingdom: Animalia
- Phylum: Chordata
- Class: Aves
- Order: Passeriformes
- Family: Tyrannidae
- Genus: Mitrephanes
- Species: M. phaeocercus

Binomial name
- Mitrephanes phaeocercus (Sclater, PL, 1859)

Species of bird

The tawny tufted flycatcher (Mitrephanes phaeocercus) is a small passerine bird in the tyrant flycatcher family Tyrannidae. It is found from western Mexico south to northern Nicaragua. It was formerly considered to be conspecific with the lemon-bellied tufted flycatcher (Mitrephanes aurantiiventris) and the two together were known as the northern tufted flycatcher.

== Taxonomy ==
The tawny tufted flycatcher was formally described in 1859 English zoologist Philip Sclater under the binomial name Mitrephorus phaeocercus. He specified the locality as "Mexico merid. et in Guatemala". In 1927 the Austrian ornithologist Carl Eduard Hellmayr reported that the type specimen had been collected in Córdoba, Veracruz, Mexico. The specific epithet combines the Ancient Greek φαιος/phaios meaning "dusky" or "brown" with κερκος/kerkos meaning "tail". The species is now one of three tufted flycatchers placed in the genus Mitrephanes that was introduced by Elliott Coues in 1882.

The tawny tufted flycatcher and the lemon-bellied tufted flycatcher (Mitrephanes aurantiiventris) were formerly considered as conspecific. They were split by AviList and the American Ornithological Society in 2026 based on differences in vocalizations, genetics and plumage.

Two subspecies are recognised:

- M. p. tenuirostris Brewster, 1888 – mountains of western Mexico (southeastern Sonora and southwestern Chihuahua to western Jalisco)
- M. p. phaeocercus (Sclater, 1859) – mountains of eastern and central Mexico (southwestern Tamaulipas, Zacatecas, and central Jalisco to Oaxaca and Chiapas) southward to northeastern Nicaragua

What is now the olive tufted flycatcher (M. olivaceus) of Peru and Bolivia was previously also treated as a subspecies of the tawny tufted flycatcher.

== Description ==
The tawny tufted flycatcher is 12 to 13.5 cm (4.7 to 5.3 in) long and weighs about 8.5 g (0.30 oz). The sexes have the same plumage and both subspecies have an erect pointed crest. Adults of the nominate subspecies M. p. phaeocercus have a brown-tinged olive crown, a pale spot above the lores, and a thin buff-white eye-ring on an otherwise cinnamon face. Their upperparts are brownish with an olive tinge. Their wings are dusky with buff ends on the coverts that show as two wing bars. They have whitish or pale yellow edges on their tertials. Their tail is dusky. Their throat and breast are bright ochre to cinnamon and their belly ochre-yellow. They have a dark iris, a black maxilla, an orange-yellow mandible, and blackish legs and feet. Juveniles have a dark brown crown with cinnamon-buff edges on its feathers and those of their upperparts. Subspecies M. p. tenuirostris is paler and duller than the nominate.

== Distribution and habitat ==
The two subspecies of the tawny tufted flycatcher are found thus:

- M. p. tenuirostris: western Mexico from southeastern Sonora and southwestern Chihuahua south to western Jalisco
- M. p. phaeocercus: mountains of eastern and central Mexico from the latitude of Zacatecas south through Guatemala, northern El Salvador, and Honduras into far northeastern Nicaragua

The tawny tufted flycatcher has also been observed as a vagrant in Texas and Arizona.

The tawny tufted flycatcher inhabits a variety of wooded montane landscapes in the upper tropical to lower temperate zones. These including pine, pine-oak, evergreen, and secondary forests and also more open areas and gallery forest. It tends to favor the forest edges and gaps and clearings within it. In elevation it ranges between 1,200 and 3,000 m (3,900 and 9,800 ft).

== Behavior ==
=== Movement ===
The tawny tufted flycatcher is mostly a year-round resident. It makes some elevational migration in Mexico.

=== Feeding ===
The tawny tufted flycatcher feeds on insects. It typically forages singly or in pairs at any level of the forest but primarily at its mid-level. It sits upright on a perch and captures prey in mid-air with sallies from it ("hawking"). It often returns to the same perch, and usually "shivers" its wings and tail when landing. It does not join mixed-species feeding flocks.

=== Breeding ===
The tawny tufted flycatcher breeds between April and June in Costa Rica and its season includes February in Colombia. Its breeding season elsewhere has not been defined. Its nest is an open cup made from moss, liverworts and lichens lined with softer material. Nests have been found between about 4 and 27 m (15 and 90 ft) above the ground, sometimes in the saddle of dangling vines and sometimes hidden in epiphytes on a tree branch. The clutch is two eggs. The incubation period, time to fledging, and details of parental care are not known.

=== Vocalization ===
The tawny tufted flycatcher's dawn song is "a rapid series of high notes bip-bip-bip-dididi-up-bip-bip-bibibiseer". It also sings "single or repeated tchwee or turee notes" and in the breeding season "seeeu or seer". Its call is pik or beek".

== Status ==
The IUCN has assessed the tawny tufted flycatcher as being of least concern. It has an extremely large range; its estimated population of at least 500,000 mature individuals is believed to be decreasing. No immediate threats have been identified. It is considered "fairly common" in northern Central America.
