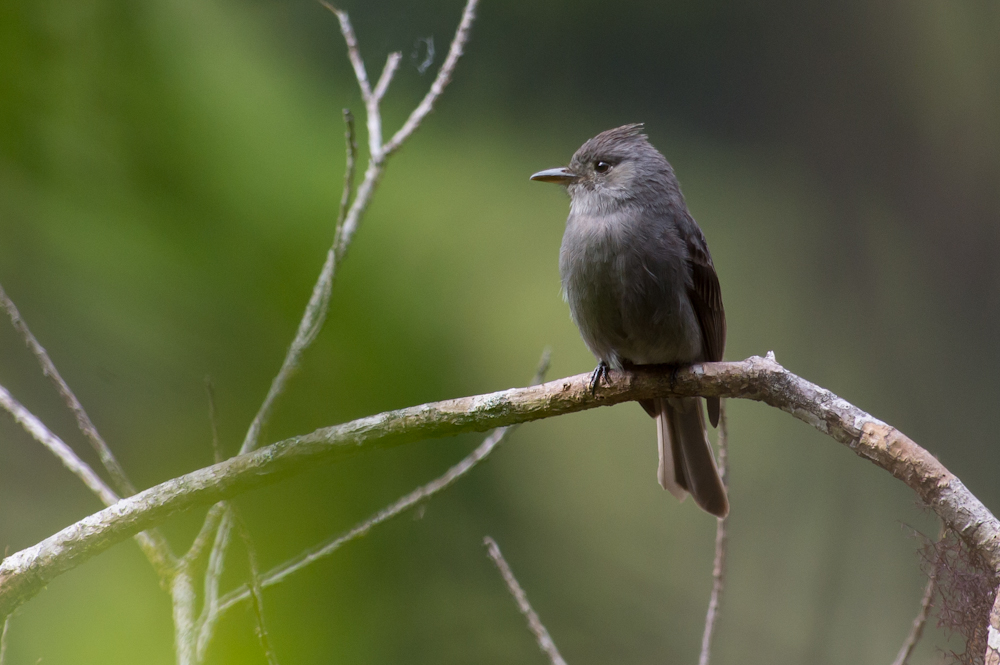

Conservation status
- Least Concern (IUCN 3.1)

Scientific classification
- Kingdom: Animalia
- Phylum: Chordata
- Class: Aves
- Order: Passeriformes
- Family: Tyrannidae
- Genus: Contopus
- Species: C. fumigatus

Binomial name
- Contopus fumigatus (D'Orbigny & Lafresnaye, 1837)

= Smoke-colored pewee =

Species of bird

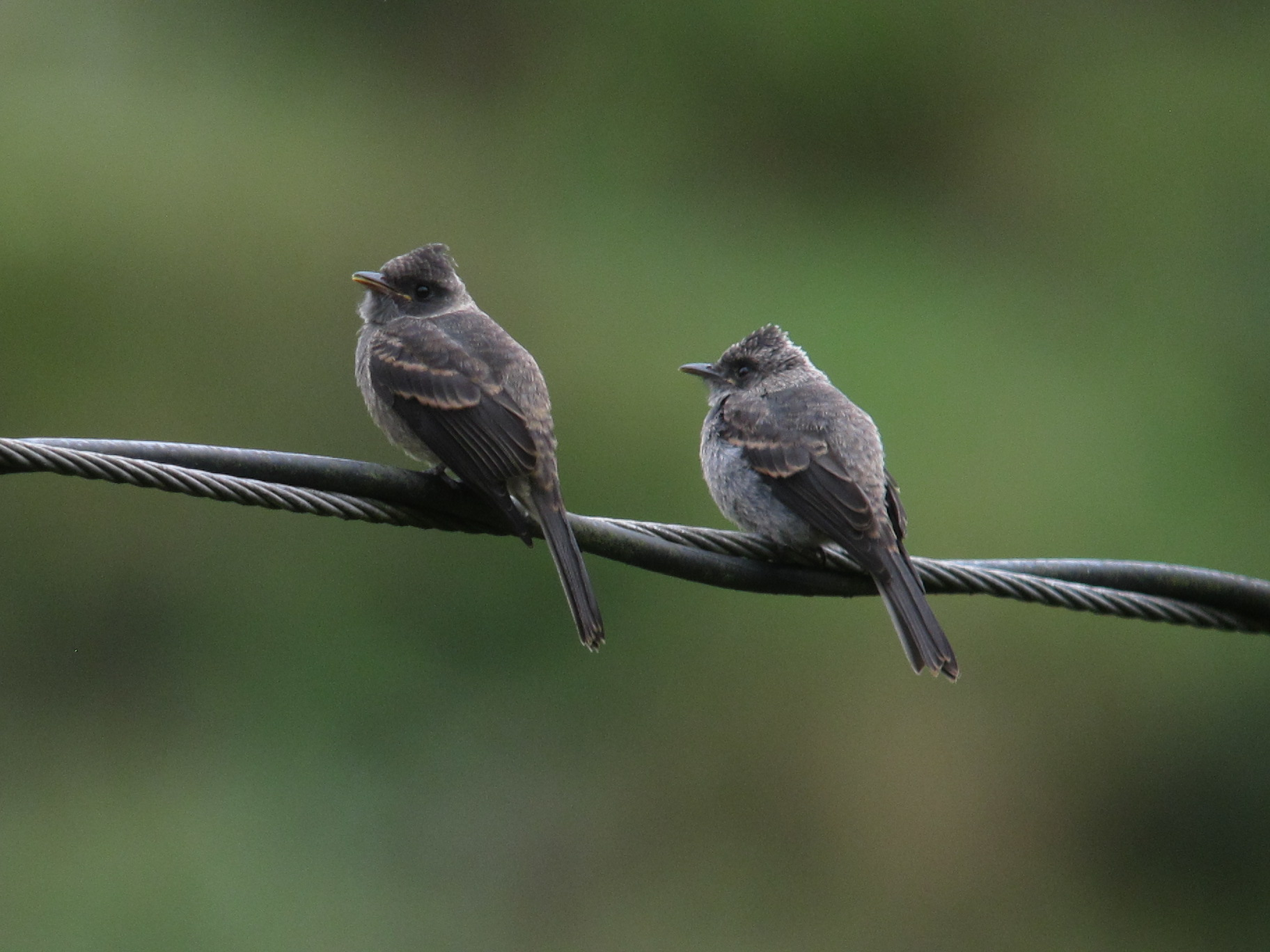
Contopus fumigatus, Smoke-colored Pewee (juveniles) perched on wire

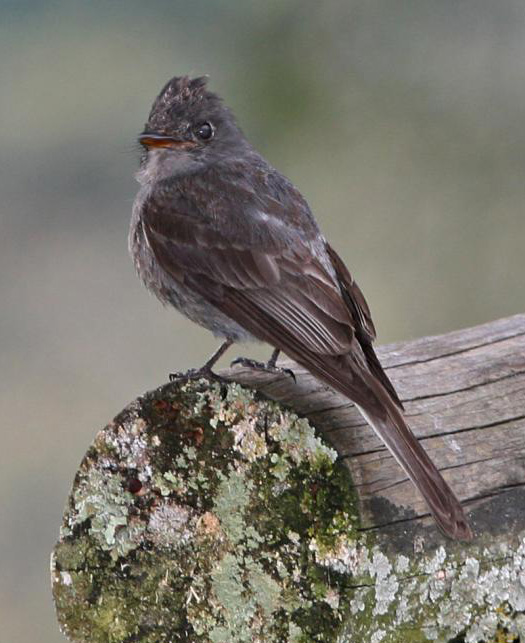
Smoke-colored pewee displays its slight crest and grey coloration

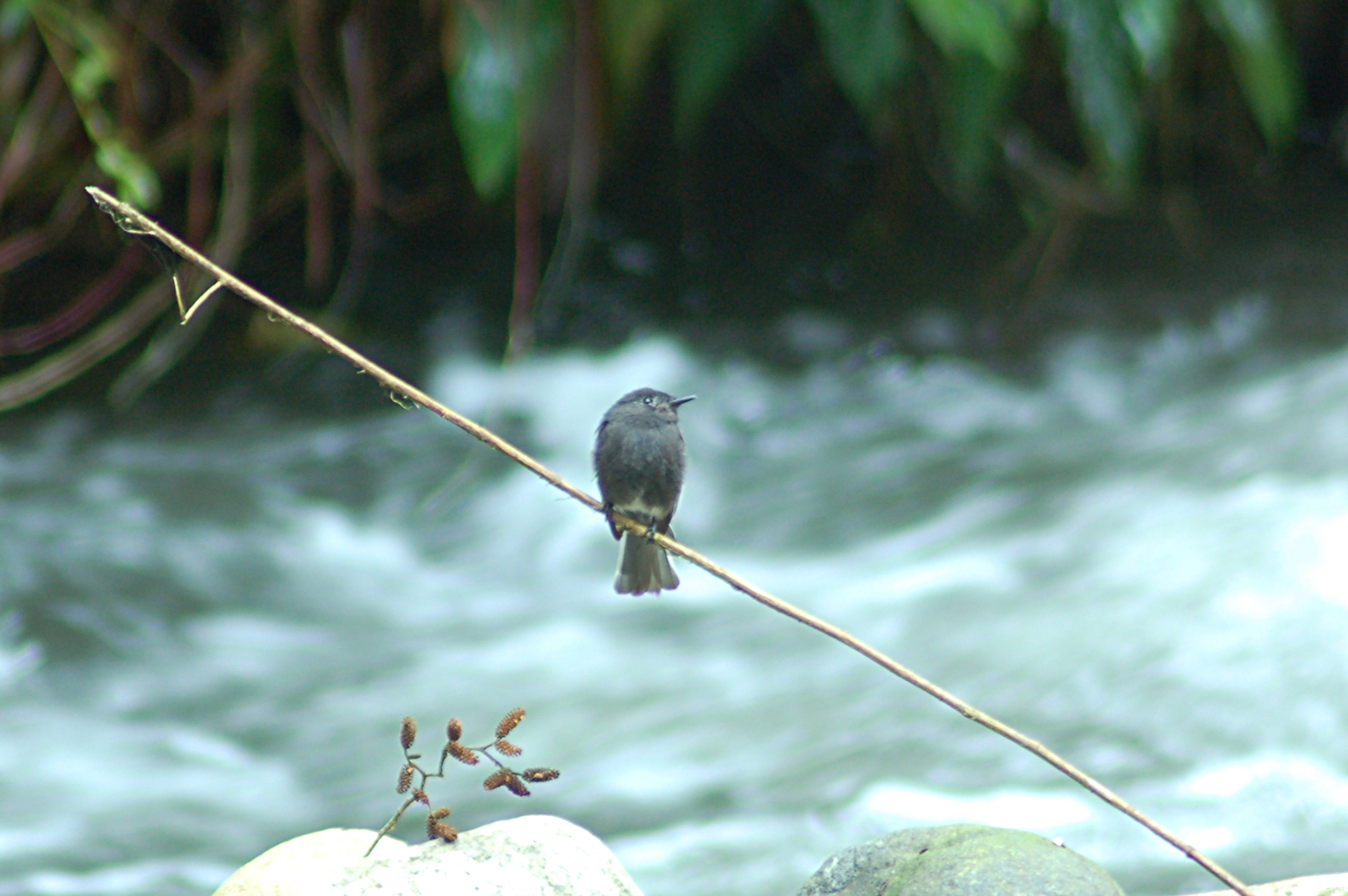
Smoke-colored Pewee perches on a small twig, displaying its size. 2015-06-04. Alambi Cloud Forest Lodge, Tandayapa, Pichincha Province, Ecuador

The smoke-colored pewee (Contopus fumigatus) is a species of bird in the family Tyrannidae. The species is characterized by a uniform dusky-grey plumage.

Smoke-colored pewees are found in Argentina, Bolivia, Brazil, Colombia, Ecuador, Guyana, Peru, and Venezuela. Their natural habitats are subtropical or tropical dry forests, subtropical or tropical moist montane forests, and heavily degraded former forests.

== Taxonomy and systematics ==
The smoke-colored pewee belongs to the family Tyrannidae, known as the tyrant flycatchers. The Tyrannidae are considered to be the largest family of birds on earth, containing over 400 species. The group shows large variation in form and plumage and can be found in every country in the Americas.

The species was first formally described by the French naturalists Alcide d'Orbigny and Frédéric de Lafresnaye in 1837, based on a specimen found in the Bolivian Yungas. The generic name Contopus derives from the Ancient Greek kontos (pole) and pous (foot). The specific name fumigatus comes from the Latin fumus (smoke).

Six subspecies are recognized:

- C. f. ardosiacus (Lafresnaye, 1844) - Colombia and W Venezuela to E Ecuador and NE Peru
- C. f. cineraceus (Lafresnaye, 1848) - Subtropical N Venezuela (Yaracuy to Miranda)
- C. f. duidae (Chapman, 1929) - Tepuis of S Venezuela (s Bolívar and Amazonas), adj. Guyana
- C. f. zarumae (Chapman, 1924) - SW Colombia (Nariño), W Ecuador, and NW Peru (south to southwestern Cajamarca)
- C. f. fumigatus - the nominate subspecies (d'Orbigny & Lafresnaye, 1837) - SE Peru (Puno) and W Bolivia (La Paz and Cochabamba)
- C. f. brachyrhynchus (Cabanis, 1883) SE Peru (Puno) and W Bolivia (La Paz and Cochabamba)

== Description ==
The smoke-colored pewee is a grey bird with a slight crest on its head. Their beaks are orange with a black culmen. Mature birds are 16–17 cm in size and 18-20g in weight. This species displays no sexual dimorphism, meaning both sexes share the same plumage. Their feet are anisodactyl, therefore three digits on their foot are forward and one is back. This is the most common foot type in perching birds.

=== Plumages ===
Adult smoke-colored pewees have a uniform grey plumage, though the upper body and wing tips may be tinged with olive or a pale brown. The crown is a dark gray with a crest. The edges of the tertials may be a light brown. Two pale, narrow wingbars may be present, but near indistinct. The throat, breast, and belly may be a slightly paler grey. The undertail-coverts are yellowish-white. Both sexes look alike. As you move North in smoke-colored pewee habitat range, birds typically become darker and greyer.

Juvenile smoke-colored pewees are typically lighter and browner than mature birds. A fringed buff of feathers can be seen at the bird's nape. Two to three wingbars are visible, and both the wingbars and belly are slightly ochre.

== Habitat and distribution ==
The smoke-colored pewee is endemic to the countries of Argentina, Bolivia, Brazil, Colombia, Ecuador, Guyana, Peru, and Venezuela. Its natural habitats are subtropical or tropical dry forests, subtropical or tropical moist montane forests, and heavily degraded former forests. Birds are typically found at 1000-2500m, reaching as high as 3000m in the Andes and as low as sea-level in Southwest Ecuador. Their habitat geography ranges from mountainous regions to foothills, but they avoid flat lowlands. .

Smoke-colored Pewees are typically resident; they do not migrate.

== Behavior ==
The smoke-colored pewee is often found perched on small branches at middle elevations. This differentiates it from the closely related Blackish pewee, which is slightly smaller and perches closer to the ground.

=== Vocalization ===
The smoke-colored pewee has a range of calls, with the most common being a loud "pip pip pip". At dawn a "where-di-WIT… whew" can be heard. A clear, repeated "peeew" whistle is also common. Though rare, alternate calls range from a hoarse, repeated "zur" to a whistled "whueer" to short "pjeek pjeek" notes.

=== Breeding and reproduction ===
Smoke-colored pewees produce altricial chicks, meaning they require a significant amount of parental care. They create cup-shaped nests made of moss and lichen in high, horizontal branches. White eggs are flecked with brown and lavender. One study found egg incubation period to be 16 days, with the nestling leaving the nest 21 days after hatching. Both male and female parent participated in feeding the chick, while only one bird constructed the nest.

Of nine nests studied, all were active in the drier months of September to December. The mean nest height was 8.8m, eggs are covered an average of 67% of daylight hours, and nestlings received around 3-10 feedings per hour. Clutch ranges from 2-4 eggs.

=== Diet ===
The smoke-colored pewee primarily consumes insects that they obtain through sallying. Sallying refers to a foraging technique commonly used by flycatchers, where a bird will catch insects from the air but return to a perch to feed. Birds often return to the same perch between each feeding session.

== Conservation and threats ==
The smoke-colored species is categorized as a species of least concern. The bird can be found in almost every protected reserve of the Andean range. Its habitat range is large and spread out throughout South America, and the species is generally tolerant of habitat disturbance. The smoke-colored pewee is categorized as fairly common to common.
