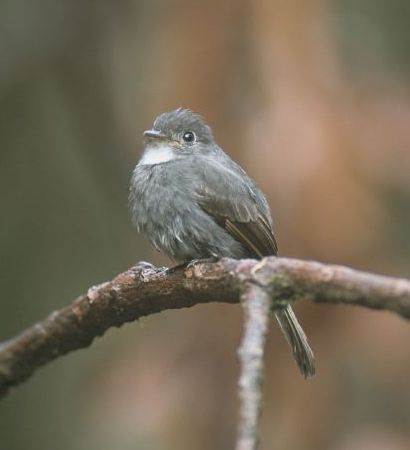

Conservation status
- Least Concern (IUCN 3.1)

Scientific classification
- Kingdom: Animalia
- Phylum: Chordata
- Class: Aves
- Order: Passeriformes
- Family: Tyrannidae
- Genus: Contopus
- Species: C. albogularis

Binomial name
- Contopus albogularis (Berlioz, 1962)

= White-throated pewee =

Species of bird

The white-throated pewee (Contopus albogularis) is a species of bird in the family Tyrannidae, the tyrant flycatchers. It is found in Brazil, French Guiana, and Suriname.

== Taxonomy and systematics ==
The white-throated pewee was originally described as Myiochanes albogularis. The species is monotypic.

== Description ==
The white-throated pewee is about 13 cm (5.1 in) long. The sexes have the same plumage. Adults have a dark blackish gray crown with a slight crest, slightly paler gray lores, and a thin white eye-ring on an otherwise dark sooty gray face. Their back is also dark sooty gray. Their wings are blackish brown and their tail blackish. Their throat is white and the rest of their underparts sooty gray. They have a dark iris, a wide flat bill with a black maxilla and yellow mandible, and black legs and feet.

== Distribution and habitat ==
The white-throated pewee is found at scattered locations from eastern Suriname east through central French Guiana into far northeastern Brazil's Amapá state. It inhabits the edges and clearings of humid primary and secondary forest. In elevation it ranges between 400 and 700 m (1,300 and 2,300 ft).

== Behavior ==
=== Movement ===
The white-throated pewee is a year-round resident.

=== Feeding ===
The white-throated pewee feeds on insects, though details are lacking. It sits erect on an exposed perch high in a tree and captures prey in mid-air with sallies from it ("hawking"). It usually returns to the same perch after a sally and "shivers" its tail upon landing.

=== Breeding ===
Nothing is known about the white-throated pewee's breeding biology.

=== Vocalization ===
The white-throated pewee's vocalizations are not well known. As of April 2025 xeno-canto and the Cornell Lab of Ornithology's Macaulay Library each had nine recordings with two of them in common. The species' call is described as a "high, dry wic-wic- -".

== Status ==
The IUCN has assessed the white-throated pewee as being of Least Concern. Its population size is not known and is believed to be stable. No immediate threats have been identified. It is considered "uncommon and very local". It is common locally in Suriname's Brownsberg Nature Park.
