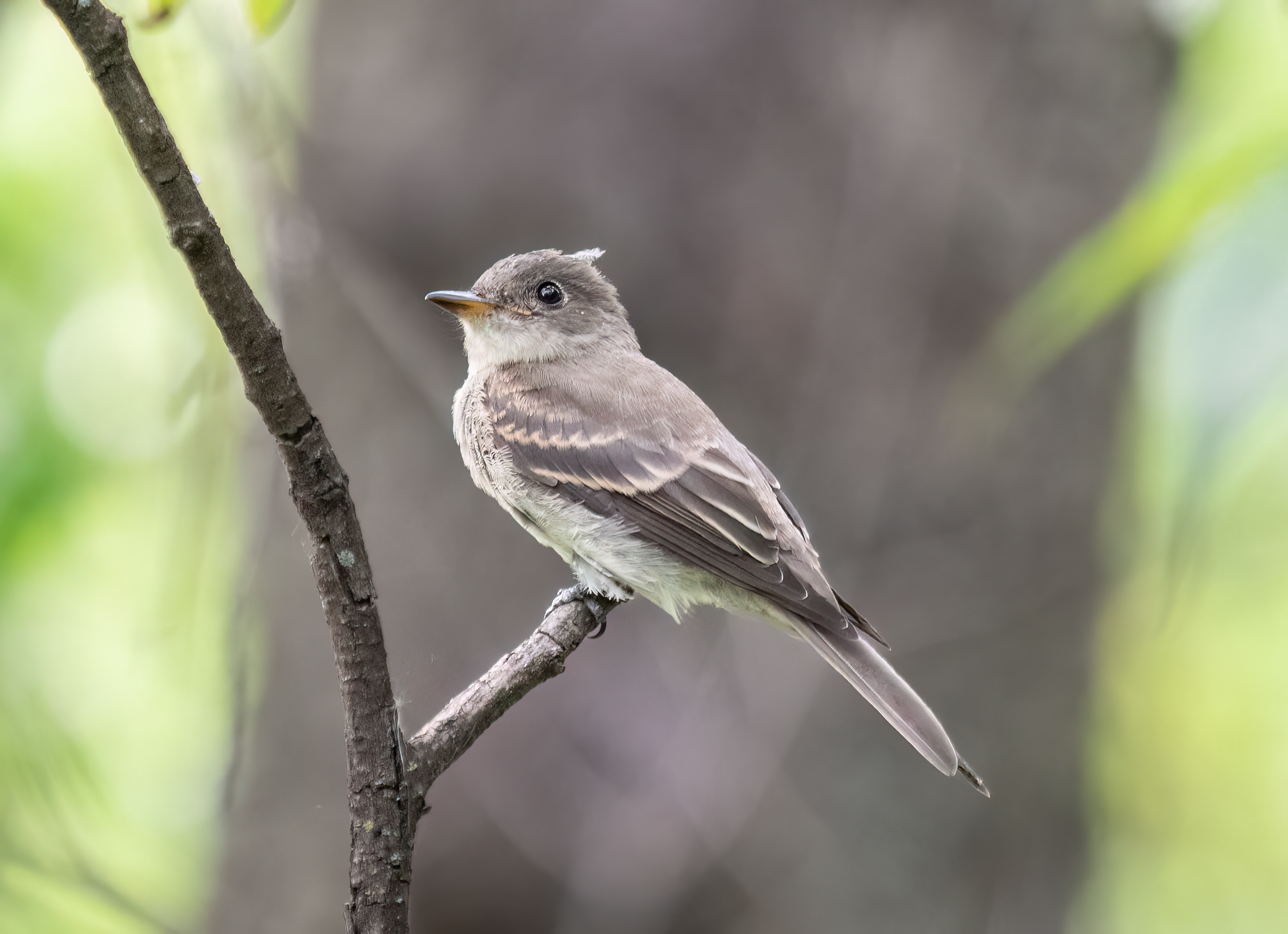
- In Central Park, New York, USA

Conservation status
- Least Concern (IUCN 3.1)

Scientific classification
- Kingdom: Animalia
- Phylum: Chordata
- Class: Aves
- Order: Passeriformes
- Family: Tyrannidae
- Genus: Contopus
- Species: C. virens

Binomial name
- Contopus virens (Linnaeus, 1766)
- Approximate distribution map Breeding Migration Non-breeding

Synonyms
- Muscicapa virens Linnaeus, 1766

Audio
- Song recorded in Ontario, Canada

= Eastern wood pewee =

Species of bird

The eastern wood pewee (Contopus virens) is a small tyrant flycatcher from North, Central and South America. This bird and the western wood pewee (C. sordidulus) were formerly considered a single species. The two species are virtually identical in appearance, and can be distinguished most easily by their calls.

== Taxonomy ==
In 1760, the French zoologist Mathurin Jacques Brisson included a description of the eastern wood pewee in his Ornithologie based on a specimen collected in the Carolinas. He used the French name Le gobe-mouche cendré de la Coroline and the Latin Muscicapa Carolinensis cinerea. Although Brisson coined Latin names, these do not conform to the binomial system and are not recognised by the International Commission on Zoological Nomenclature. When in 1766 the Swedish naturalist Carl Linnaeus updated his Systema Naturae for the twelfth edition, he added 240 species that had been previously described by Brisson. One of these was the eastern wood pewee. Linnaeus included a brief description, coined the binomial name Muscicapa virens and cited Brisson's work. The specific name virens is Latin for "green". This species is now placed in the genus Contopus that was introduced by the German ornithologist Jean Cabanis in 1855. The species is monotypic.

== Description ==
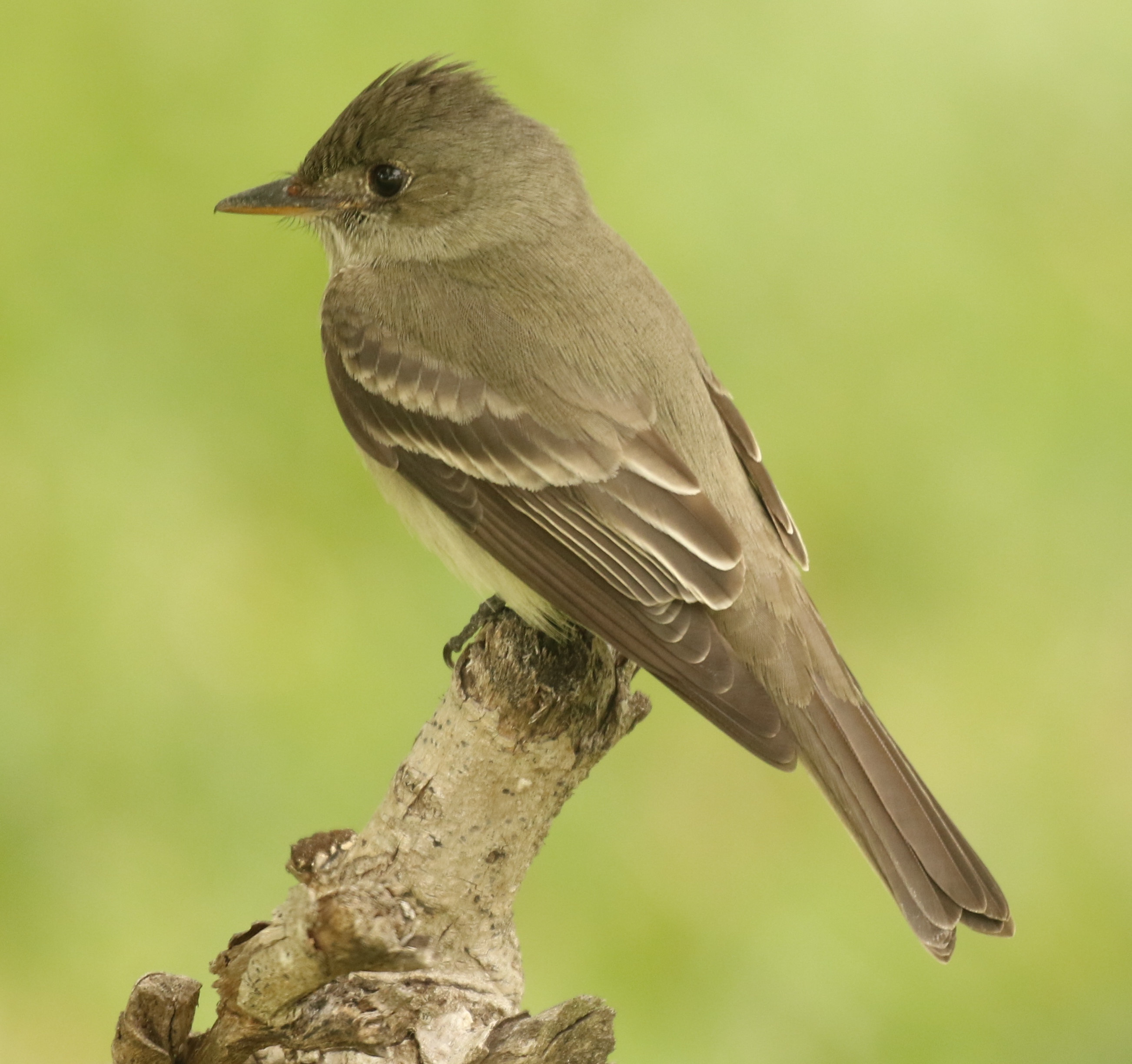
South Padre Island, Texas

The eastern wood pewee is 13.5–15 cm (5.3–5.9 in) in length and weighs around 14 g (0.49 oz). Wingspan ranges 9.1–10.2 in (23–26 cm). The sexes are alike. The adult is gray-olive on the upperparts with light underparts, washed with olive on the breast. Each wing has two pale wing bars, and the primary remiges are long, giving the wingtip a slim and very pointed appearance. The upper part of the bill is dark, the lower part is yellowish. The songs are basically a mournful whistled pee-a'wee given in a series, which gave this bird its name, and a "pe-wee" with a rising note at the end.

=== Similar species ===
The western wood pewee (C. sordidulus) is essentially indistinguishable visually. But its range is parapatric to the west of the eastern wood pewee and its song—a descending tsee-tsee-tsee-peeer—is entirely different.

The eastern phoebe (Sayornis phoebe) is similar, particularly in the worn plumage after breeding. It always lacks clearly defined wingbars, however, and bobs its tail frequently. It has a shorter primary projection. The eastern phoebe is also present on the breeding grounds by March, while eastern wood pewees do not arrive until very late April and early May. The songs (fee-bee, fee-bee) and calls (chip) are quite different. The least flycatcher (Empidonax minimus) is quite similar to the eastern wood pewee in plumage, but has a bold eye ring and much shorter primary projection, appearing rather blunt-winged. It also has a shorter bill and is smaller overall. The songs (che-bec, che-bec) and calls (a sharp whit) are very different.

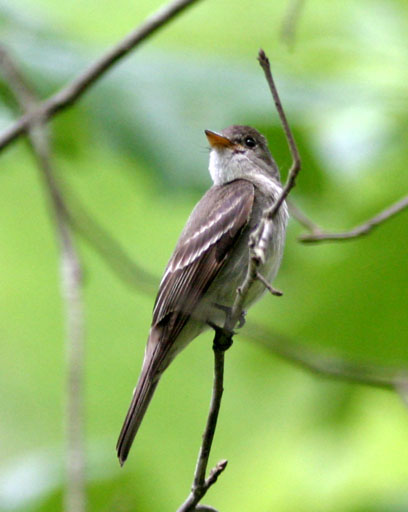
Eastern wood pewee has two crisp, pale wing bars and long primary projection.

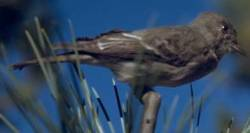
Western wood pewee looks like its sister species.

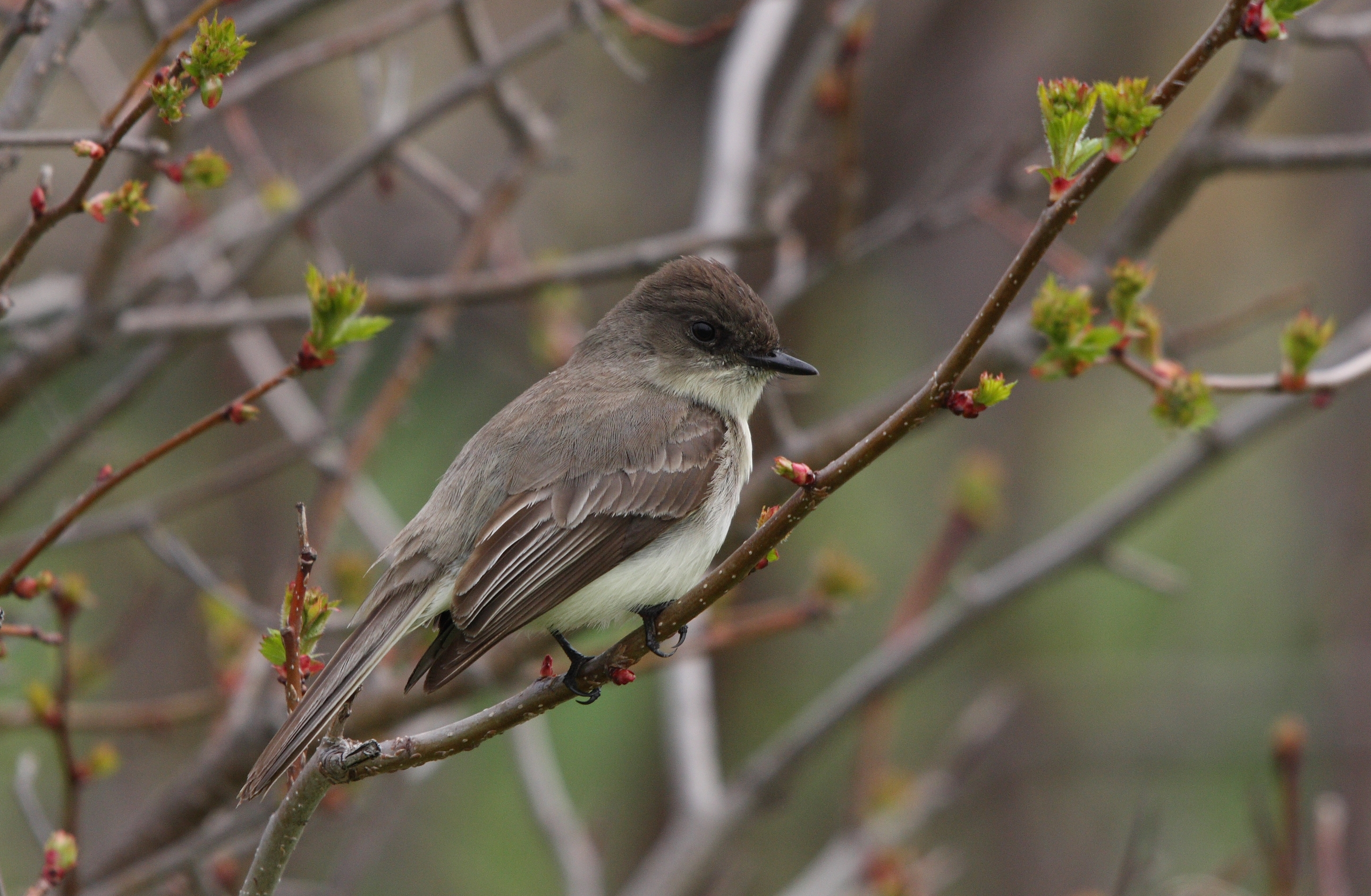
Eastern phoebe lacks bolder wing bars and has shorter primary projection.

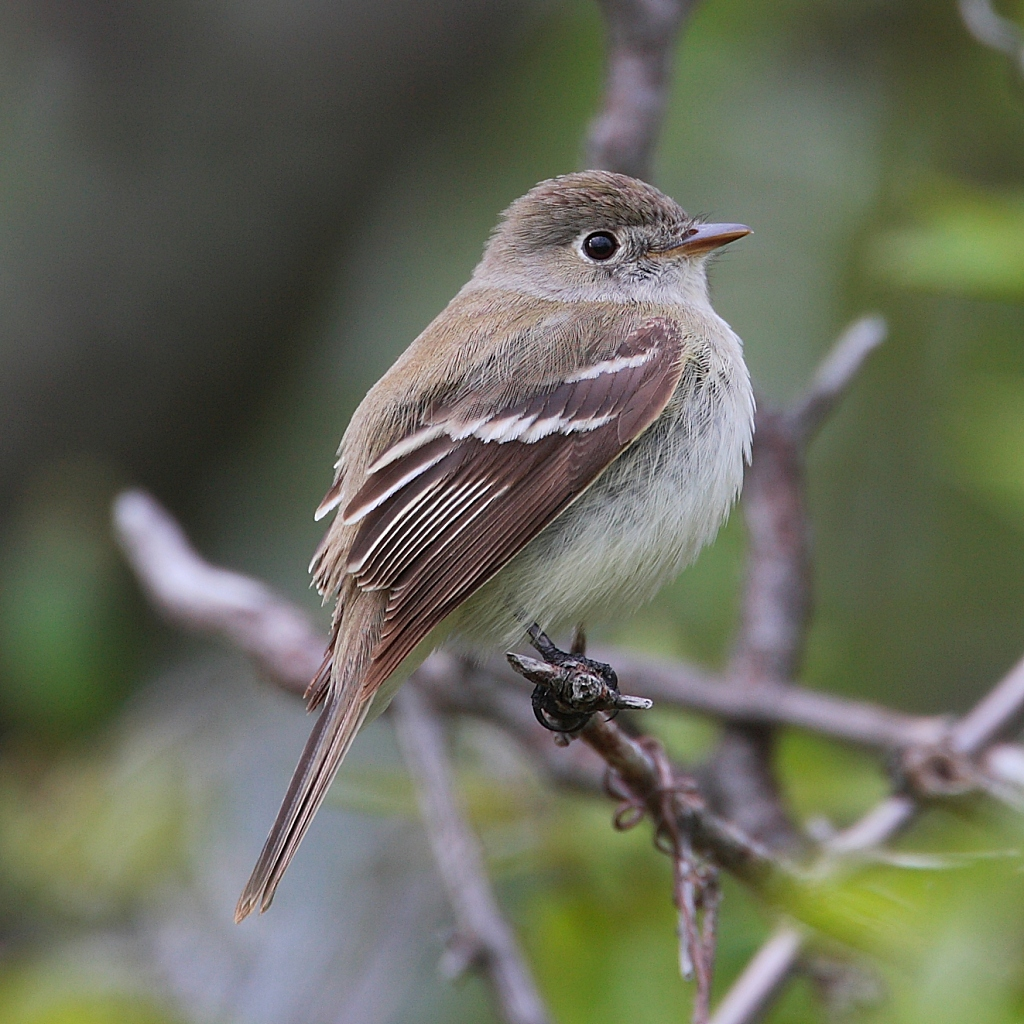
Least flycatcher has bold eye-rings and shorter primary projection.

== Distribution and habitat ==
Their breeding habitat is deciduous, mixed woods, or pine plantations in eastern North America. They migrate to Central America, the Caribbean, and in the Andes region of northern South America. They feed on insects and other arthropods. Wood pewees wait on a perch at a middle height in a tree and fly out to catch prey in flight, sometimes hovering to pick it from vegetation.

Eastern wood pewees arrive relatively late on breeding grounds (e.g., 18 May to 5 June in southern Ontario). They are rarely seen on their breeding grounds before the last days of April further south. They migrate south at a more usual time, leaving sometimes in late August but most often in September. Migration times have stayed the same in the last 100 years. They migrate quickly for most of the journey, dispersing and moving at a slower speed when approaching breeding or wintering range. For example, in the Cayman Islands which are offshore the winter quarters, the species is only rarely and briefly encountered, but passes through on its way north as early as mid-late February.

== Behaviour ==
=== Breeding ===
The eastern wood pewee makes an open cup nest made of grasses, bark, and lichen, attached to a horizontal tree branch with spider webs. Nest sites range in height from 15 to 60 ft (4.6 to 18.3 m), but average around 30 ft (9.1 m). Common nest trees used include oaks (Quercus), pines (Pinus), birches (Betula), and maples (Acer). The female lays almost always three (sometimes two) translucent-white eggs with brown flecking concentrated towards the larger end of the ovate egg. Males are territorial and defend the nesting area aggressively, often fighting with neighbouring conspecifics and even pursue attacks on other species (e.g., least flycatchers, American robins, chipping sparrows, red-eyed vireos, etc.). Males can sometimes be polygynous, mating with two females, simultaneously.

The eggs hatch in 12–14 days and both parents bring food to the altricial nestlings. Nestlings typically fledge 15–17 days after hatching, often ending up on the ground during the first flight out of the nest. The adults will perch on a nearby branch and call out to the nestlings, keeping contact and providing them with food until the young are able to fly to join them.

== Conservation status ==
The eastern wood pewee is common and widespread, and therefore not considered globally threatened by the IUCN. Its numbers, however, are declining in recent decades, possibly due to the loss of forest habitat in its winter range. It is also possible that the increase of white-tailed deer (Odocoileus virginianus) in its breeding range has led to a change in vegetation and associated invertebrates in the lower levels of the deciduous forests where the eastern wood pewee breeds.
