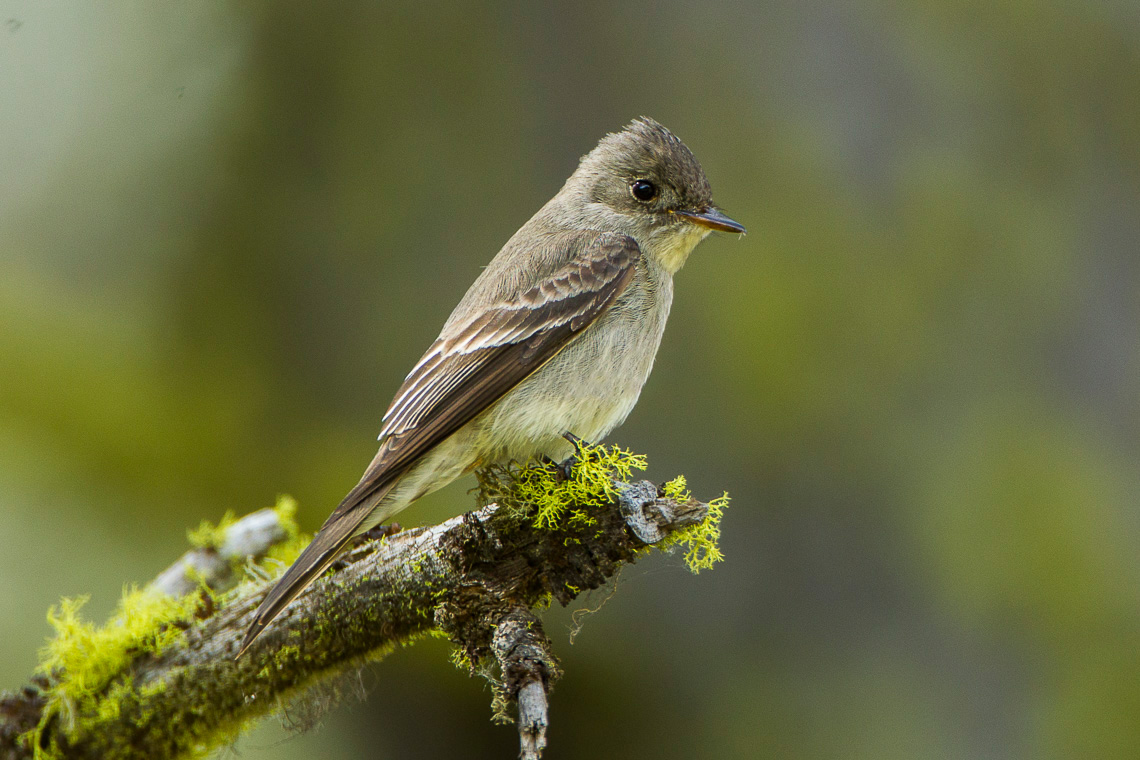

Conservation status
- Least Concern (IUCN 3.1)

Scientific classification
- Kingdom: Animalia
- Phylum: Chordata
- Class: Aves
- Order: Passeriformes
- Family: Tyrannidae
- Genus: Contopus
- Species: C. sordidulus

Binomial name
- Contopus sordidulus Sclater, PL, 1859
- Breeding Migration Nonbreeding

Audio

= Western wood pewee =

Species of bird

The western wood pewee (Contopus sordidulus) is a small tyrant flycatcher.

== Description ==
Adults are gray-olive on the upperparts with light underparts, washed with olive on the breast. They have two wing bars and a dark bill with yellow at the base of the lower mandible. This bird is very similar in appearance to the eastern wood pewee; the two birds were formerly considered to be one species. The call of C. sordidulus is a loud buzzy peeer; the song consists of three rapid descending tsees ending with a descending peeer. The bird is about 5.5–6.3 in (14–16 cm) in length, 0.4–0.5 oz (11–14 g) in weight, and has a wingspan of 10.2 in (26 cm).

== Habitat and ecology ==
Their breeding habitat is open wooded areas in western North America. These birds migrate to South America at the end of summer. The female lays two or three eggs in an open cup nest on a horizontal tree branch or within a tree cavity; California black oak forests are examples of suitable nesting habitat for this species of bird. Both parents feed the young.

== Behavior ==
They often wait on a perch at a middle height in a tree and fly out to catch insects in flight (hawking), and will also hover to pluck insects from vegetation (gleaning).
