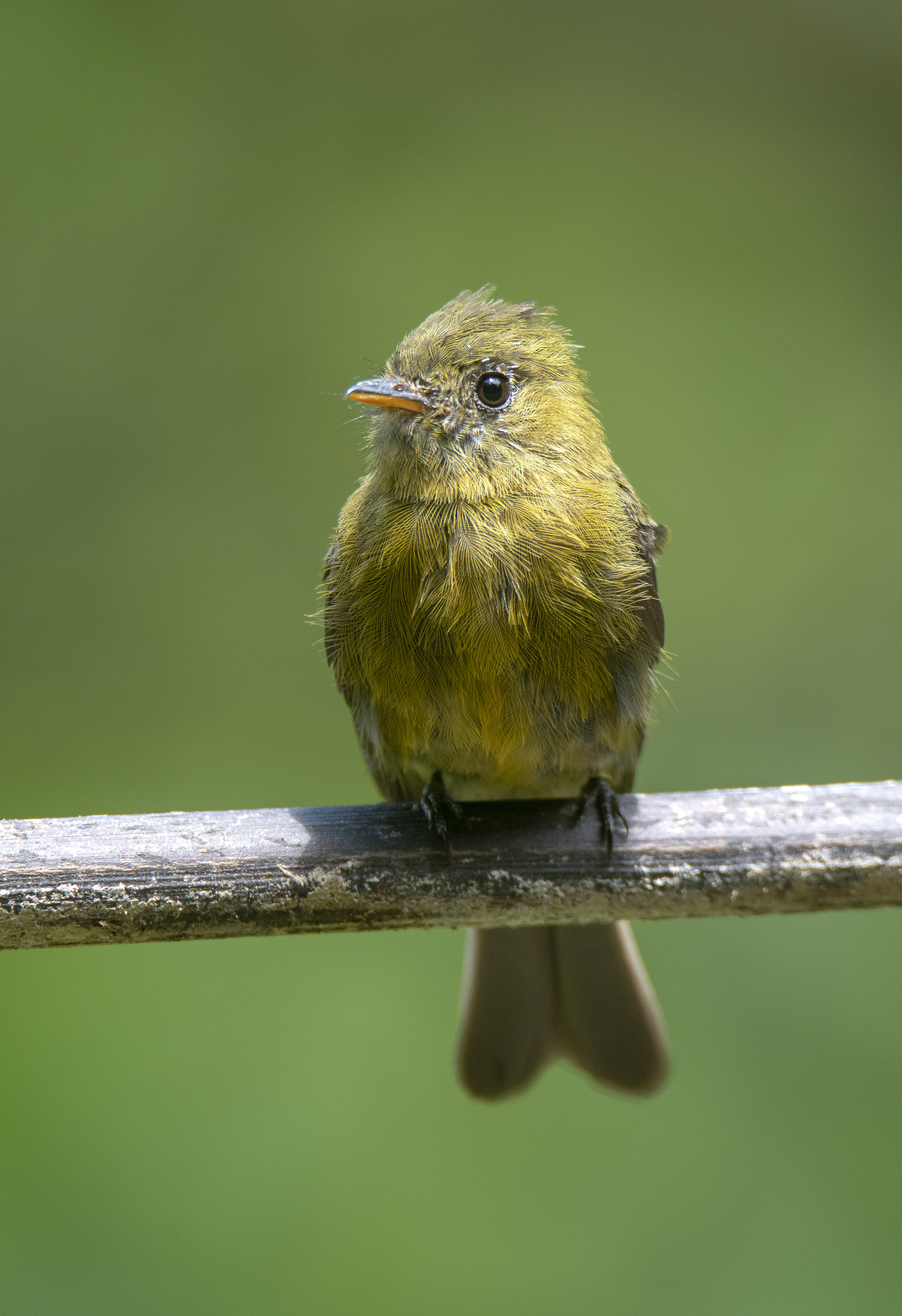

Conservation status
- Least Concern (IUCN 3.1)

Scientific classification
- Kingdom: Animalia
- Phylum: Chordata
- Class: Aves
- Order: Passeriformes
- Family: Tyrannidae
- Genus: Mitrephanes
- Species: M. olivaceus

Binomial name
- Mitrephanes olivaceus Berlepsch & Stolzmann, 1894

= Olive tufted flycatcher =

Species of bird

The olive tufted flycatcher or olive flycatcher (Mitrephanes olivaceus) is a species of bird in the family Tyrannidae, the tyrant flycatchers. It is found in Bolivia and Peru.

== Taxonomy and systematics ==
The olive tufted flycatcher was originally described as a full species. For much of the twentieth century it was treated as a subspecies of the northern tufted flycatcher (M. phaeocercus) and was restored to full species status late in the century. The olive tufted and northern tufted flycatchers are the only species in genus Mitrephanes. The olive tufted flycatcher is monotypic.

== Description ==
The olive tufted flycatcher is 12 to 13 cm (4.7 to 5.1 in) long and weighs about 8.5 g (0.30 oz). The sexes have the same plumage and both have an erect pointed crest. Adults have an olive crown, a pale spot above the lores, and a thin buff-white eye-ring on an otherwise olive face. Their upperparts are olive. Their wings are dusky with grayish olive ends on the coverts that show as two wing bars. They have faint pale edges on their secondaries and tertials. Their tail is dusky. Their throat, breast, and flanks are olive with a light ochre tinge on the breast; their central belly is a yellower olive. They have a dark iris, a black maxilla, an orange-yellow mandible, and blackish legs and feet.

== Distribution and habitat ==
The olive tufted flycatcher is found in the Andes from southern Amazonas Department in far northern Peru south into northwestern Bolivia as far as Cochabamba Department. It also occurs disjunctly on Cerro Chinguela on the border of northern Peru's Piura and Cajamarca departments and its range possibly extends further north into southern Ecuador. It inhabits humid montane forest, where it favors the edges and openings within it such as those caused by fallen trees. In elevation it overall ranges between 1,000 and 2,300 m (3,300 and 7,500 ft) but in Peru is found only above 1,400 m (4,600 ft).

== Behavior ==
=== Movement ===
Nothing is known about the olive tufted flycatcher's movements if any.

=== Feeding ===
The olive tufted flycatcher feeds on insects. It typically forages singly or in pairs at any level of the forest. It sits upright on a perch and captures prey in mid-air with sallies from it ("hawking"). It often returns to the same perch, and usually "shivers" its wings and tail when landing. It regularly but not exclusively joins mixed-species feeding flocks.

=== Breeding ===
Nothing is known about the olive tufted flycatcher's breeding biology.

=== Vocalization ===
The olive tufted flycatcher's song is "a series of high musical chips followed by a loud, high, descending whistle: tchi-tchi'SEEEW!" and its call is "a rapid series of high, musical chips" tchi-tchi=-tchi-tchi-tchi". It occasionally gives the song's SEEEW! note by itself.

== Status ==
The IUCN has assessed the olive tufted flycatcher as being of Least Concern. It has a large range; its population size is not known and is believed to be decreasing. No immediate threats have been identified. It is considered fairly common in Peru. It occurs in at least one national park in each of Peru and Bolivia.
