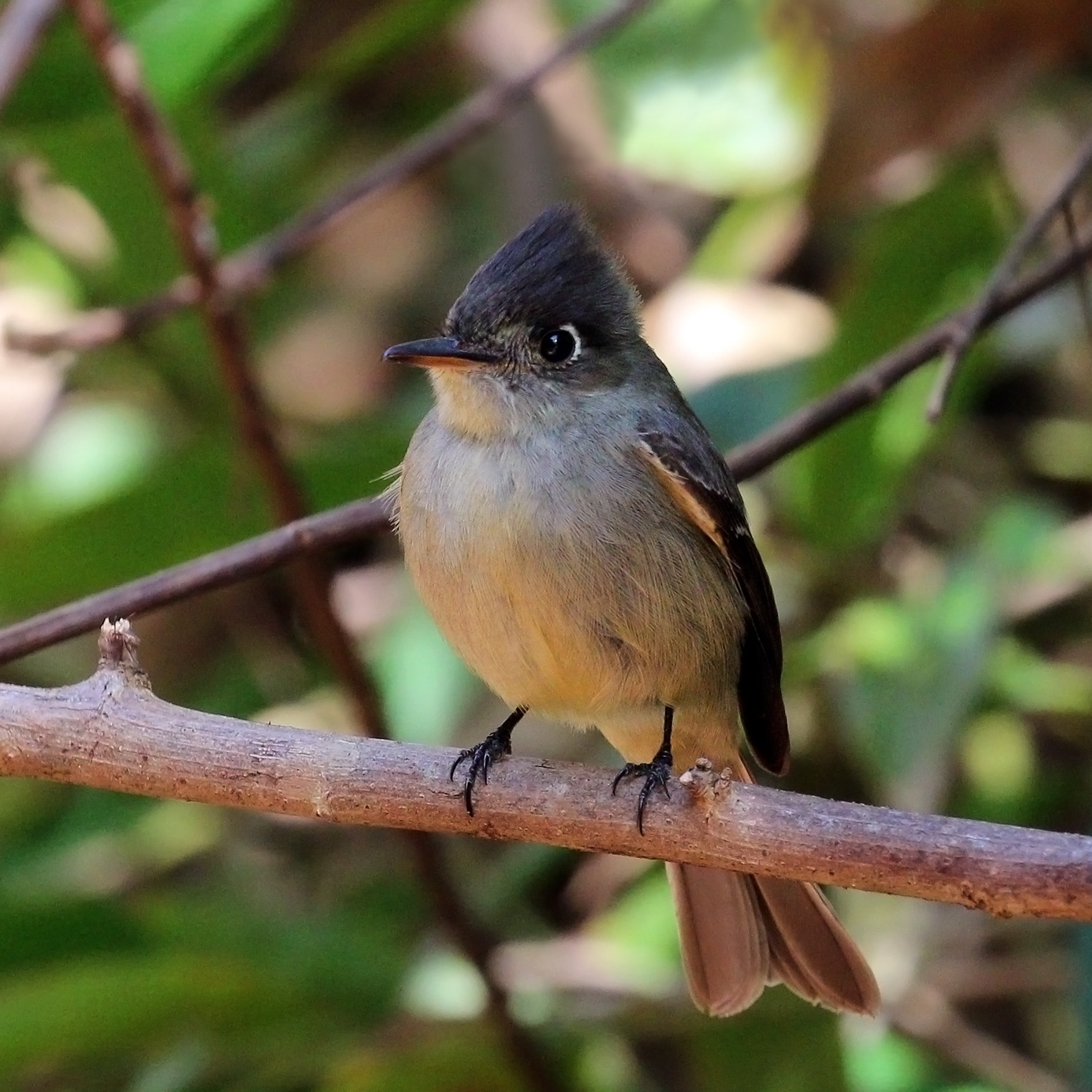
- Maravillas de Vinales; Cuba

Conservation status
- Least Concern (IUCN 3.1)

Scientific classification
- Kingdom: Animalia
- Phylum: Chordata
- Class: Aves
- Order: Passeriformes
- Family: Tyrannidae
- Genus: Contopus
- Species: C. caribaeus

Binomial name
- Contopus caribaeus (d'Orbigny, 1839)

= Cuban pewee =

Species of bird

The Cuban pewee or crescent-eyed pewee (Contopus caribaeus) is a species of bird in the family Tyrannidae, the tyrant flycatchers. It is found in Cuba and the Bahamas.

== Taxonomy and systematics ==
The Cuban pewee and what are now the Hispaniolan pewee (C. hispaniolensis) and Jamaican pewee (C. pallidus) were formerly treated as one species, the Greater Antillean pewee. They were separated following a study published in 1993 that detailed differences in their vocalizations, plumage, and measurements.

The Cuban pewee has these four subspecies:

- C. c. bahamensis (Bryant, H, 1859)
- C. c. caribaeus (d'Orbigny, 1839)
- C. c. morenoi Burleigh & Duvall, 1948
- C. c. nerlyi Garrido, 1978

== Description ==
The Cuban pewee is 15 to 16.5 cm (5.9 to 6.5 in) long and weighs 8.5 to 13.5 g (0.30 to 0.48 oz). The sexes have the same plumage. Adults of the nominate subspecies C. c. caribaeus have a dark olive-gray crown with a slight crest, slightly paler olive-gray lores, and a whitish crescent around the back of the eye on an otherwise olive-brown face. Their back is also olive-brown. Their wings are dusky brown with pale tips on the coverts that show as two faint wing bars. The wing's outer secondaries and tertials have whitish edges. Their tail is dusky. Their throat is pale gray with a slight buff tinge, their breast beige-gray with an olive wash on the sides, and their belly and undertail coverts buffy mustard-yellow. Juveniles have wider and buffy white wing bars. Subspecies C. c. bahamensis is duller, grayer, and paler than the nominate, with only a slight yellow tinge on the belly. Subspecies C. c. morenoi and C. c. nerlyi are generally intermediate between the nominate and bahamensis but have mostly buffish underparts. All subspecies have a dark iris, a wide flat bill with a black maxilla and orange-yellow mandible, and black legs and feet.

== Distribution and habitat ==
The subspecies of the Cuban pewee are found thus:

- C. c. bahamensis: Grand Bahama, Great Abaco, New Providence, Eleuthera, Cat, and Andros islands in the northern Bahamas
- C. c. caribaeus: mainland Cuba and Isla de la Juventud (Isle of Pines)
- C. c. morenoi: south coast of mainland Cuba (especially Zapata Swamp) and nearby cays
- C. c. nerlyi: Jardines de la Reina and nearby islands off the southern coast of mainland Cuba

The Cuban pewee inhabits the interior and edges of broadleaf and pine forest, brushy scrublands, swampy areas, and tree plantations in the tropical and upper tropical zones. Subspecies C. c. morenoi is found primarily in mangroves. In elevation it ranges from sea level to 1,800 m (5,900 ft) though it is rarer above 1,000 m (3,300 ft).

== Behavior ==
=== Movement ===
The Cuban pewee is a year-round resident.

=== Feeding ===
The Cuban pewee feeds mostly on insects and includes some fruit in its diet. It sits erect on an exposed perch low to the ground and captures prey in mid-air with sallies from it ("hawking"). It usually returns to the same perch after a sally and "shivers" its tail upon landing.

=== Breeding ===
The Cuban pewee breeds between March and June in Cuba and in February and March in the Bahamas. Its nest is an open cup made from thin rootlets and hair with lichen and moss on the outside. It is typically placed in a branch fork or on a branch. The clutch is two to four eggs that are white with heavy dark spots on the large end. The incubation period, time to fledging, and details of parental care are not known.

=== Vocalization ===
The dawn song of the Cuban pewee's nominate subspecies is "a high squeaky whistle, eeah, ooweeah, usually given sequentially". That of C. c. bahamensis adds a "dee-dee" phrase to the end of the same song. During the day the species sings "a prolonged descending weeeooooo". Its calls are "a repeated weet or dee [and] softer dep or vi-vi notes".

== Status ==
The IUCN has assessed the Cuban pewee as being of Least Concern. It has a large range; its population size is not known and is believed to be stable. No immediate threats have been identified. It is considered common and "[w]idespread from coast to moderate elevations".
