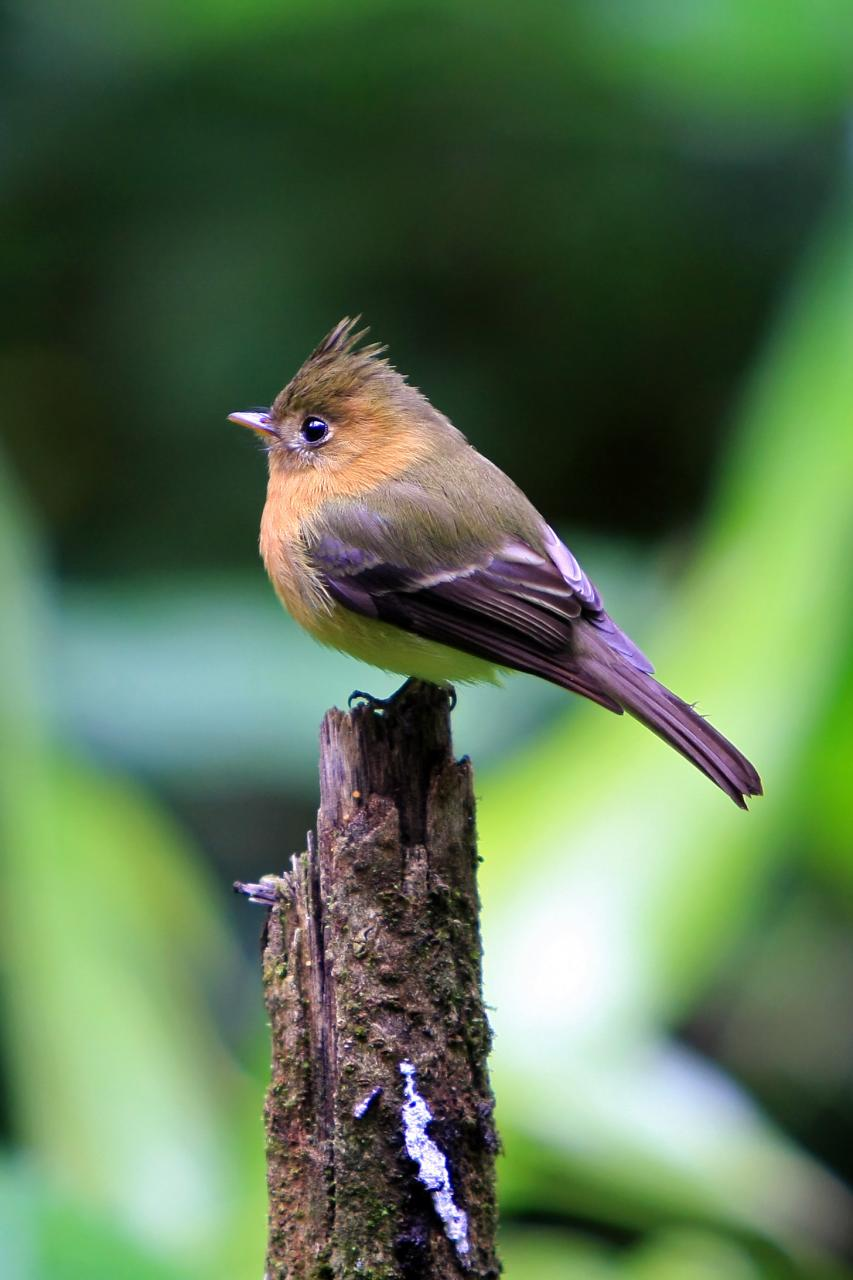
- In Costa Rica

Conservation status
- Not evaluated (IUCN 3.1)

Scientific classification
- Kingdom: Animalia
- Phylum: Chordata
- Class: Aves
- Order: Passeriformes
- Family: Tyrannidae
- Genus: Mitrephanes
- Species: M. aurantiiventris

Binomial name
- Mitrephanes aurantiiventris (Lawrence, 1865)
- Range

= Lemon-bellied tufted flycatcher =

Species of bird

The lemon-bellied tufted flycatcher (Mitrephanes aurantiiventris) is a small passerine bird in the tyrant flycatcher family Tyrannidae. It is found in montane evergreen forest from Costa Rica south to northwestern Colombia and northwestern Ecuador. It was formerly treated as conspecific with the tawny tufted flycatcher (Mitrephanes phaeocercus) and the two together were known as the northern tufted flycatcher.

== Taxonomy ==
The lemon-bellied tufted flycatcher was formally described in 1865 by the American ornithologist George Newbold Lawrence based on a specimen collected by the German doctor Alexander von Frantzius at Tabacales in Costa Rica. Lawrence coined the binomial name Mitrephorus aurantiiventris where the specific epithet combines the late Medieval Latin aurantius meaning "orange-coloured" with the Latin venter, ventris meaning "belly".

The lemon-bellied tufted flycatcher and the tawny tufted flycatcher (Mitrephanes phaeocercus) were formerly considered as conspecific. They were split by AviList and the American Ornithological Society in 2026 based on differences in vocalizations, genetics and plumage.

Two subspecies are recognised:

- M. a. aurantiiventris (Lawrence, 1865) – highlands of Costa Rica and Panama (eastward to Altos del Maria area in eastern Coclé and western Panamá provinces)
- M. a. berlepschi Hartert, 1902 – far eastern Panama to northwestern Colombia and northwestern Ecuador
