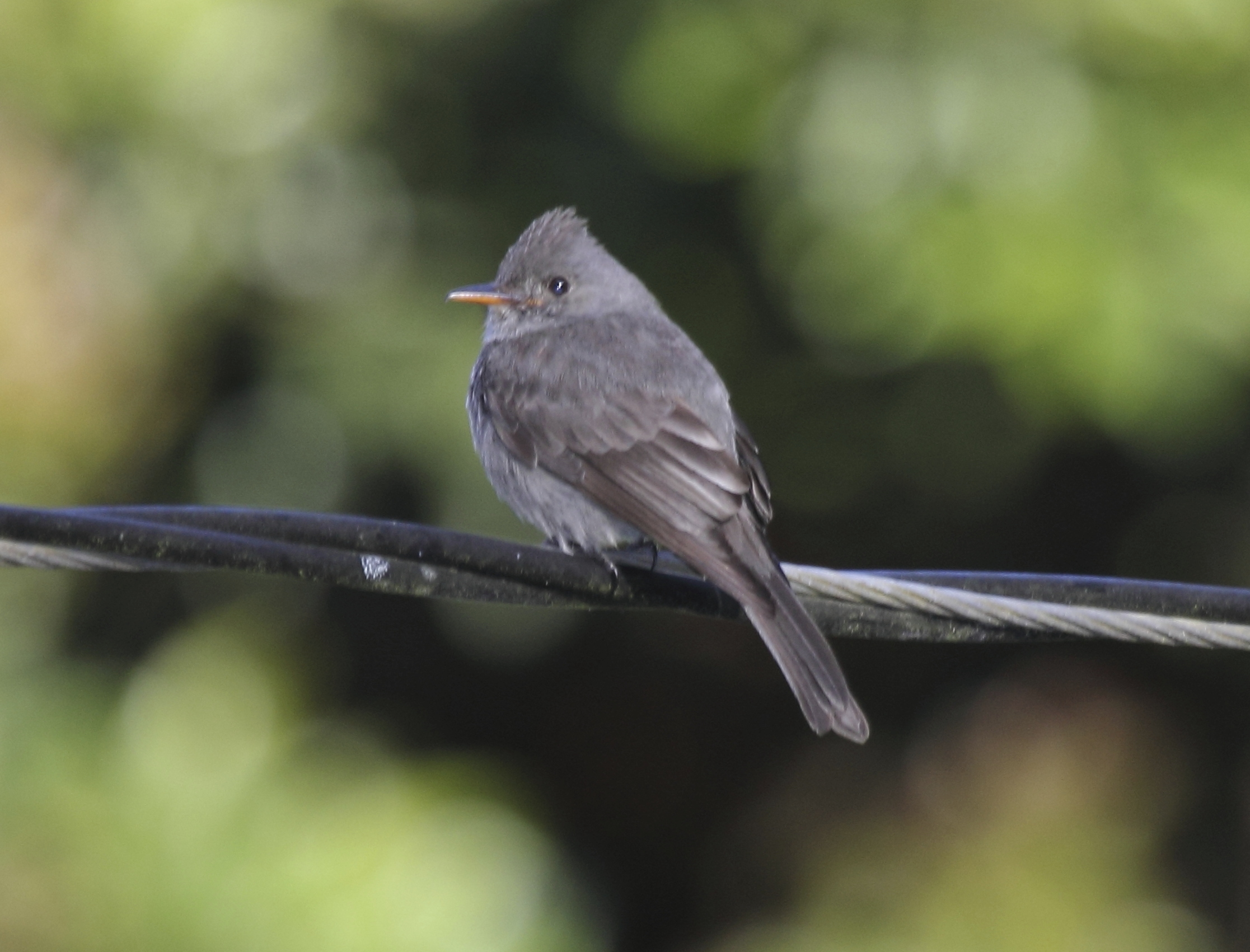

Conservation status
- Least Concern (IUCN 3.1)

Scientific classification
- Kingdom: Animalia
- Phylum: Chordata
- Class: Aves
- Order: Passeriformes
- Family: Tyrannidae
- Genus: Contopus
- Species: C. lugubris

Binomial name
- Contopus lugubris Lawrence, 1865

= Dark pewee =

Species of bird

The dark pewee (Contopus lugubris) is a small passerine bird in the tyrant flycatcher family. It is endemic to the Talamancan montane forests of Costa Rica and western Panama.

This large, dark pewee is found between 1250 m and 2150 m altitude in wet mountain forests, especially at the edges and in clearings, and in adjacent semi-open areas with tall trees. The nest is a broad, thick-walled saucer of mosses and lichens, lined with plant fibres. It is placed 5–18 m high across a branch. The eggs are undescribed, but the female builds the nest, lays only two eggs and incubates the eggs for 15–16 days before they hatch.

The dark pewee is 16.5 cm long and weighs 23 g. The upperparts are sooty-grey, darkest on the prominently crested crown. The wings and tail are blackish, the wings having grey feather edges and a weak wing bar. The throat is pale grey, with most of the rest of the underparts a paler olive-grey than the back, becoming yellowish on the lower belly. Sexes are similar, but young birds are browner above and have rufous fringes to the wing feathers.

The dark pewee is solitary when not breeding. It perches on a high watchpoint from which it sallies forth to catch flying insects, returning to the same exposed perch.

This is a conspicuous species, with an incessant loud whip call, and repetitive fred-reek-fear song. It will defend the nest aggressively against larger species, including the emerald toucanet.
