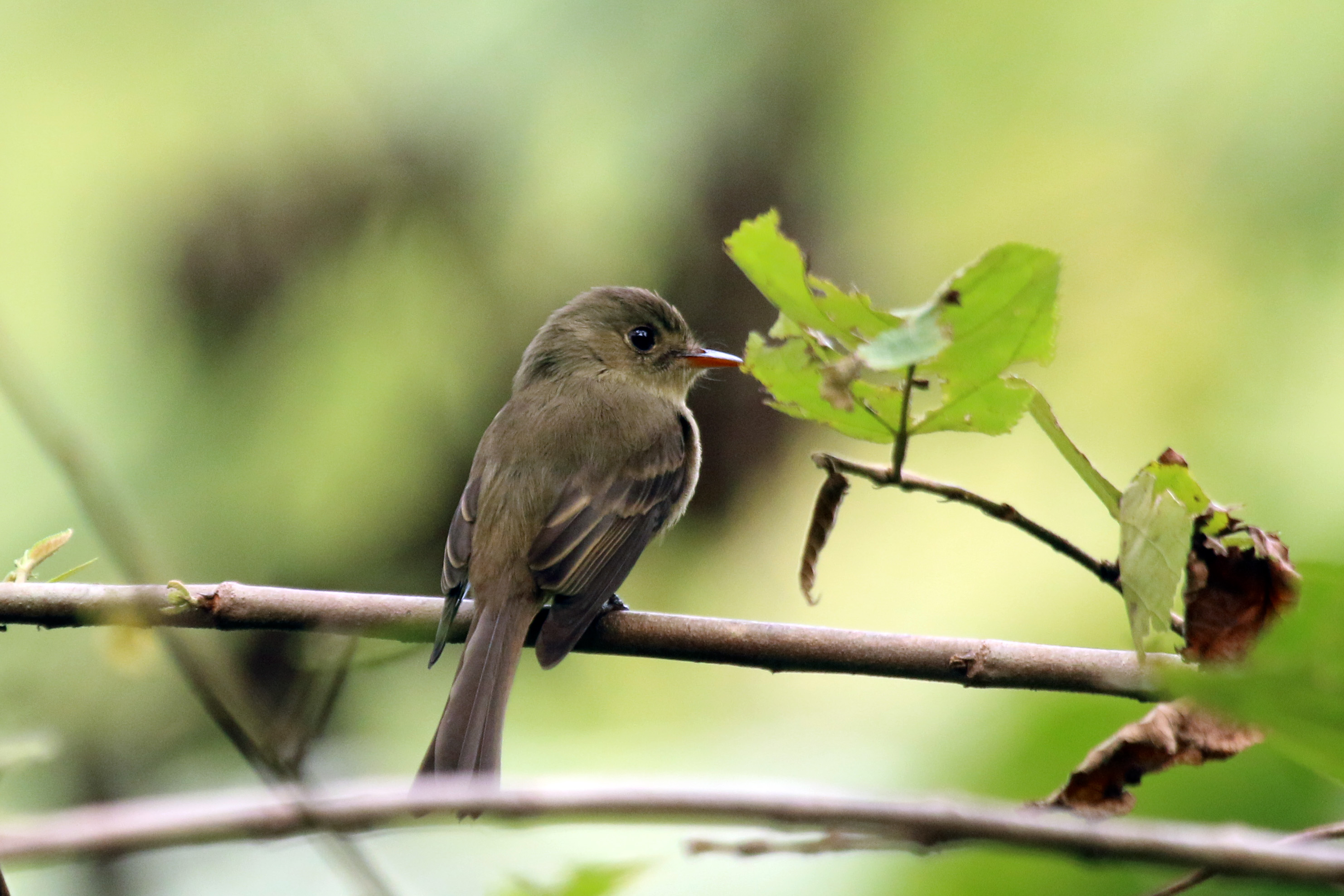

Conservation status
- Least Concern (IUCN 3.1)

Scientific classification
- Kingdom: Animalia
- Phylum: Chordata
- Class: Aves
- Order: Passeriformes
- Family: Tyrannidae
- Genus: Contopus
- Species: C. pallidus

Binomial name
- Contopus pallidus (Gosse, 1847)

= Jamaican pewee =

Species of bird

The Jamaican pewee (Contopus pallidus) is a species of bird in the family Tyrannidae. It is endemic to Jamaica. It was formerly regarded as a subspecies of the Greater Antillean pewee (C. caribaeus).

== Taxonomy ==
Contopus pallidus was first described by Philip Henry Gosse in 1847. It belongs to the family Tyrannidae. This species used to be seen as conspecific with the Cuban pewee and the Hispaniola pewee, meaning that all three birds were once classified as the same species.

The Jamaican Pewee is monotypic.

== Description ==
The Jamaican Pewee measures 15 cm (5.9 in) from bill to tail and weighs 9–9.5g. It has proportionately short wings and long tail with a round body and large head. The bill is relatively large with the bottom of the bill being orange. The top of the Jamaican pewee is dark-olive toned, while the wings and tail become darker and the stomach is paler. While the male and female birds look similar, the younger birds are greyer on the top and paler on the stomach and beak than the adult birds. The lifespan of the Jamaican pewee is 3.5 years on average.

== Distribution and habitat ==
The Jamaican pewee is only found in Jamaica. It can be found on forest edges in mid-elevation across the country, and it can rarely be found in high elevations. There is no distinction for how low Jamaican pewees will fly, but they have been seen to go as high as 2,000 metres. The Jamaican pewee has been seen to fly to lower elevations during the non-breeding season.

== Behaviour ==
The Jamaican pewee perches upright on obvious perches specifically when looking for its prey. It will dive down to grab its prey from the air, returning to the same or new perch, while flicking its tail on the landing.

The Jamaican pewee call has a "wee-wee" sound with the second "wee" being louder than the first. Another one of their calls is an "uh-weee-oo" sound where the middle section is more whistled sounding like a "weeah" sound.

== Diet ==
The Jamaican pewee is insectivorous meaning their diet consists strictly of insects. There is no scientific evidence to show what species of insects they eat the most or least of.

== Reproduction ==
The Jamaican pewee breeds from April until June, up to two times in a season. Nests are typically constructed from fine plant fibres and located in a tree fork.

== Conservation ==
Jamaican pewees are considered a species of least concern for extinction. The Jamaican pewee population is declining. The population of the bird is suspected to be decreasing because of the ongoing habitat destruction in Jamaica. The extent of the population decrease is unknown.
