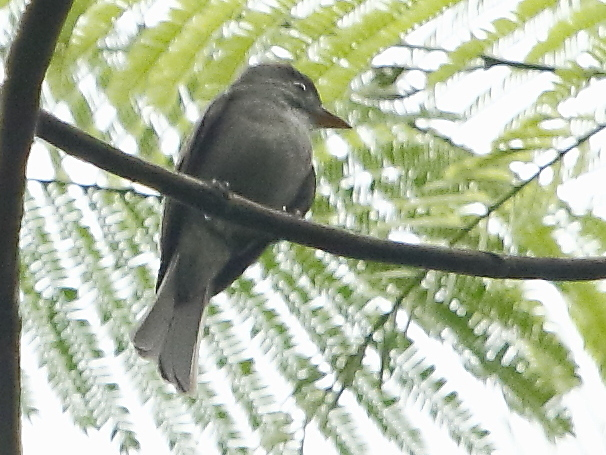
- at Carajás National Forest, State of Pará, Brazil

Conservation status
- Least Concern (IUCN 3.1)

Scientific classification
- Kingdom: Animalia
- Phylum: Chordata
- Class: Aves
- Order: Passeriformes
- Family: Tyrannidae
- Genus: Contopus
- Species: C. nigrescens

Binomial name
- Contopus nigrescens (Sclater, PL & Salvin, 1880)

= Blackish pewee =

Species of bird

The blackish pewee (Contopus nigrescens) is a species of bird in the family Tyrannidae, the tyrant flycatchers. It is found in Brazil, Ecuador, Guyana, Peru, and possibly Colombia.

== Taxonomy and systematics ==
The blackish pewee was originally described as Myiochanes nigrescens. It now has two subspecies, the nominate C. n. nigrescens (Sclater, PL & Salvin, 1880) and C. n. canescens (Chapman, 1926).

== Description ==
The blackish pewee is about 13 cm (5.1 in) long; one male weighed 9 g (0.32 oz) and a female 10 g (0.35 oz). The sexes have the same plumage. Adults of the nominate subspecies have a blackish gray crown with a slight crest and slightly paler gray lores on an otherwise dark sooty gray face. Their back is also dark sooty gray. Their wings are blackish brown and their tail dark sooty gray. Their underparts are sooty gray that is slightly paler on the throat. Juveniles have wide whitish wing bars and pale tips on the upperparts' feathers. Subspecies C. n. canescens is generally grayer than the nominate, with a dark mouse gray crown and deep neutral gray underparts. Both subspecies have a brown iris, a wide flat bill with a black maxilla and pale grayish ochre mandible, and black legs and feet.

== Distribution and habitat ==
The blackish pewee has a highly disjunct distribution. The nominate subspecies is found intermittently along most of the eastern slope of the Andes of Ecuador. It might also occur slightly further north in far southern Colombia, where the South American Classification Committee of the American Ornithological Society deems it hypothetical. One population of subspecies C. n. canescens is found intermittently on the eastern slope of the Andes in northern and central Peru. Others are found in southern Guyana and in scattered locations in eastern Amazonian Brazil. A single sight record in far northern Peru near the Ecuadoran border might be of either subspecies.

The populations of the blackish pewee inhabit different landscapes. The nominate subspecies and the Peruvian population of C. n. canescens are found in humid Andean montane forest, especially in the canopy and on its edges. The populations of C. n. canescens in Guyana and Brazil inhabit terra firme forest in foothills, again typically in the canopy and on the forest's edges. In elevation it occurs between 400 and 900 m (1,300 and 3,000 ft) in Ecuador and between 600 and 1,500 m (2,000 and 4,900 ft) in Peru.

== Behavior ==
=== Movement ===
The blackish pewee is a year-round resident.

=== Feeding ===
The blackish pewee feeds on insects, though details are lacking. It typically forages singly or in pairs. It sits erect on an exposed perch high in a tree at the forest edge or along watercourses, and captures prey in mid-air with sallies from it ("hawking"). It usually returns to the same perch after a sally and "shivers" its tail upon landing.

=== Breeding ===
The blackish pewee's breeding season varies geographically. In eastern Brazil it may span at least from July to February. In Peru it apparently begins in September. The one known nest was a shallow open cup made from moss, lichen, plant fibers, and spider web. It was under construction so its lining, if any, is unknown. The female alone constructed it. The clutch size, incubation period, time to fledging, and details of parental care are not known.

=== Vocalization ===
The song of the blackish pewee's nominate subspecies is described as "a snappy but somewhat burry chí-bew repeated at 3 to 4-second intervals" and its calls as "repeated sharp pip or peep". The song of subspecies C. n. canescens in Peru is "a slightly burry, rising-falling dzree'whew! and its call "a musical, rich, falling pew! usually in [an] evenly spaced series". In Brazil its song is described as "tjí-juww, lowered in pitch and strength" and its call as a "very high, sharp wic-wic- -". The species sings mostly in the morning but also during the rest of the day; it calls throughout the day. It sings from a high perch.

== Status ==
The IUCN has assessed the blackish pewee as being of Least Concern. Its population size is not known and is believed to be decreasing. No immediate threats have been identified. It is considered local in Brazil, "local and scarce" in Ecuador, and "rare and local" in Peru. "[The] Blackish Pewee is perceived to be at risk from deforestation".
