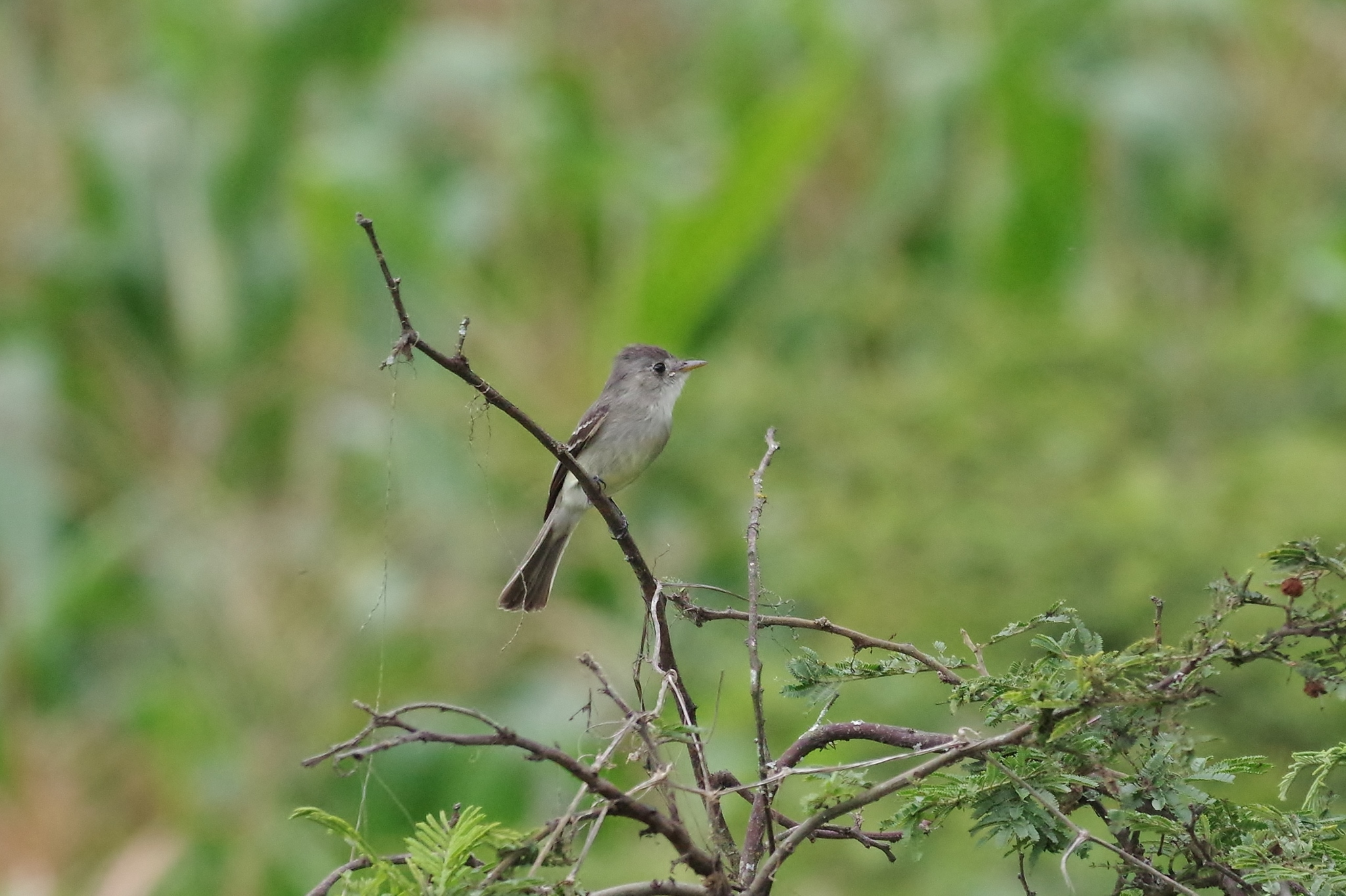

Conservation status
- Least Concern (IUCN 3.1)

Scientific classification
- Kingdom: Animalia
- Phylum: Chordata
- Class: Aves
- Order: Passeriformes
- Family: Tyrannidae
- Genus: Contopus
- Species: C. punensis

Binomial name
- Contopus punensis Lawrence, 1869

= Tumbes pewee =

Species of bird

The Tumbes pewee or western tropical pewee (Contopus punensis) is a passerine bird in the family Tyrannidae, the tyrant flycatchers. It is found in Ecuador and Peru.

== Taxonomy and systematics ==
The tumbes pewee's taxonomy is unsettled. The International Ornithological Committee (IOC), the Clements taxonomy, and BirdLife International's Handbook of the Birds of the World (HBW) treat it as a full species, though HBW calls it the "western tropical pewee". The North and South American Classification Committees of the American Ornithological Society treat it and seven other taxa as subspecies of the tropical pewee with the binomial Contopus cinereus. In 2016 HBW separated three of them as the monotypic "western tropical pewee" and the two-subspecies southern tropical pewee (C. cinereus). In 2018 the IOC recognized C. punensis as the tumbes pewee and Clements followed suit in 2022.

== Description ==
The tumbes pewee is 13 to 14 cm (5.1 to 5.5 in) long; three females weighed an average of 9.3 g (0.33 oz). The sexes have the same plumage. Adults have a dark olive-gray crown with a slight crest, white to grayish white lores, and a thin white eye-ring on an otherwise pale grayish olive face. Their back is olive-gray and their rump and uppertail coverts brownish olive-gray with a hidden white feather tuft on either side of the rump. Their wings are mostly dusky. The wing's secondaries have white to brownish gray edges at the ends and the median and greater coverts have grayish white to brownish gray tips that show as two thin wing bars. Their tail is olive-gray. Their chin and throat are white, their breast and upper belly pale grayish olive, their lower belly whitish, and their undertail coverts pale brown. Their bare parts have not been formally described but are believed to be similar to those of the northern tropical pewee (C. bogotensis). That species has a dark brown iris, a black maxilla, a yellowish or orangey mandible, and blackish legs and feet.

== Distribution and habitat ==
The tumbes pewee is found from northern Manabí Province in northwestern Ecuador south into northwestern and west-central Peru to the Department of Huancavelica. There are also records in far northeastern Ecuador's Esmeraldas Province and the species is suspected to also occur in southwestern Colombia. The tumbes pewee inhabits semi-open landscapes including deciduous and semi-humid woodlands, Podocarpus woodlands, the edges and clearings of denser forest, and locally in mangroves. In elevation it mostly occurs below 1,500 m (4,900 ft) in Ecuador though as high as 1,900 m (6,200 ft), and up to 2,800 m (9,200 ft) in Peru.

== Behavior ==
=== Movement ===
The tumbes pewee is believed to be a year-round resident.

=== Feeding ===
The tumbes pewee apparently feeds only on insects, though details are lacking. It typically forages singly or in pairs. It sits erect on a somewhat open or exposed perch on the forest edge, usually no higher than the forest's mid-level, and captures prey in mid-air with sallies from it ("hawking"). It usually returns to the same perch after a sally and "shivers" its tail upon landing. It rarely joins mixed-species feeding flocks.

=== Breeding ===
The tumbes pewee's breeding season has not been defined but includes December to March in Ecuador and at least May to July in Peru. Its nest has not been formally described but appears to be similar to that of the northern tropical pewee, which see here. One undescribed nest was 27 m (90 ft) above the ground. Nothing else is known about the species' breeding biology.

=== Vocalization ===
One description of the tumbes pewee's song is "a clear peee pir or peee, pidit". Another is "an emphatic...twwe-tee, tee-teew, or tee teeeew". Its call is "a single tee or a quiet chatter". It sings at any time of day but more often in early morning and late afternoon. It vocalizes from a perch on a bare branch in the forest's mid-story.

== Status ==
The IUCN has assessed the tumbes pewee as being of Least Concern. It has a large range; its population size is not known and is believed to be stable. No immediate threats have been identified. It is considered fairly common in Peru. It "[o]ccurs in a number of national parks and other protected areas throughout its reasonably large range".
