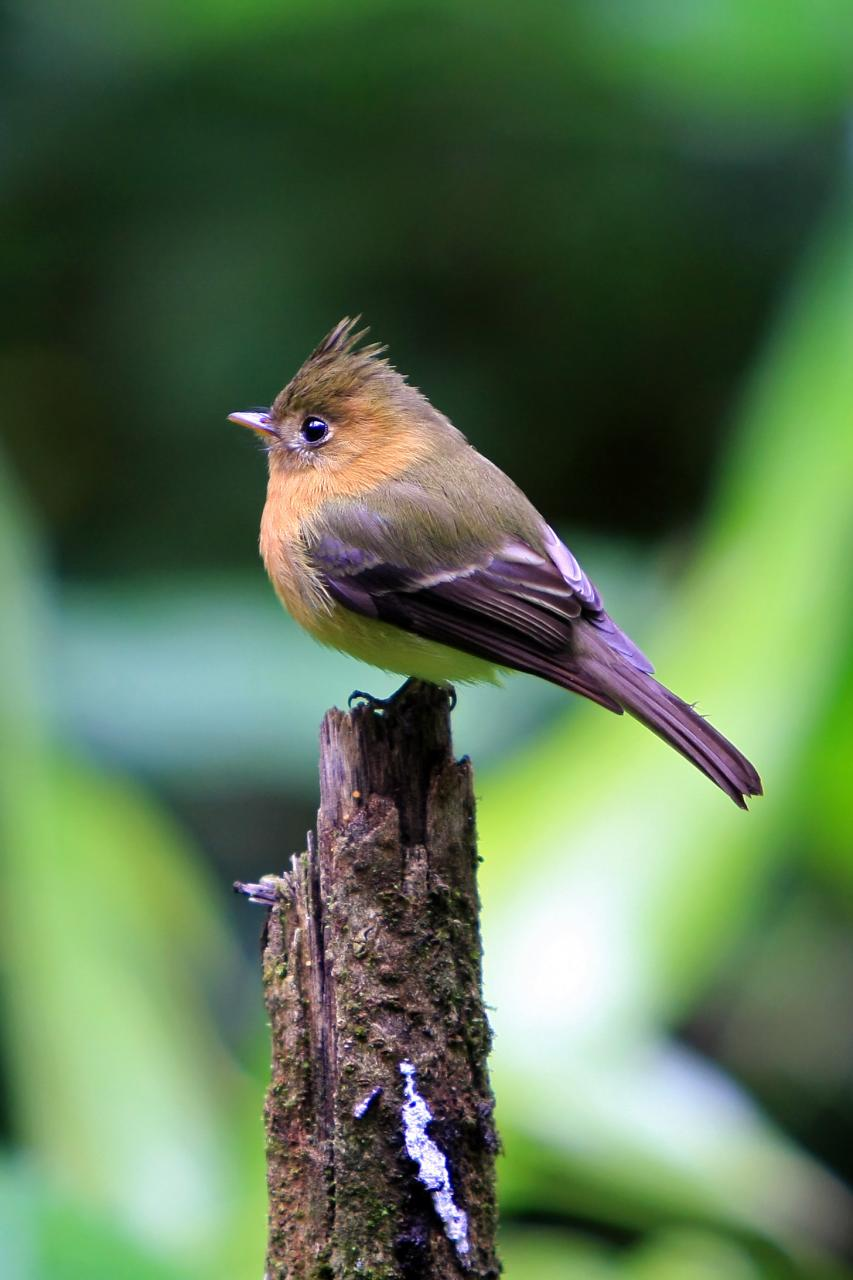
- Northern tufted flycatcher (Mitrephanes phaeocercus)

Scientific classification
- Kingdom: Animalia
- Phylum: Chordata
- Class: Aves
- Order: Passeriformes
- Family: Tyrannidae
- Genus: Mitrephanes; Coues, 1882

Type species
- Mitrephorus phaeocercus Sclater, 1859

= Mitrephanes =

Genus of birds

Mitrephanes is a genus containing three species of Central and South American birds in the tyrant flycatcher family Tyrannidae. The species contain "tufted flycatcher" in their common names.

== Taxonomy ==
The genus Mitrephanes was introduced in 1882 by the American ornithologist Elliott Coues as a replacement name for Mitrephorus that had been introduced in 1859 by English zoologist Philip Sclater. The name Mitrephorus was pre-occupied as it had been used in 1837 by Carl Johan Schönherr for a genus of beetles. In 1888 Sclater designated the type species as Mitrephorus phaeocercus Sclater, 1859. The genus name Mitrephanes combines the Ancient Greek μιτρα/mitra meaning "cap" or "head-dress" with -φανης/-phanēs meaning "-showing".

The genus contains three species:

Image	Common name	Scientific name	Distribution
	Tawny tufted flycatcher	Mitrephanes phaeocercus	western Mexico to northern Nicaragua
	Lemon-bellied tufted flycatcher	Mitrephanes aurantiiventris	Costa Rica south to northwestern Colombia
	Olive tufted flycatcher	Mitrephanes olivaceus	Yungas of Peru and western Bolivia
