= Henry Bryant (naturalist) =

American physician and naturalist

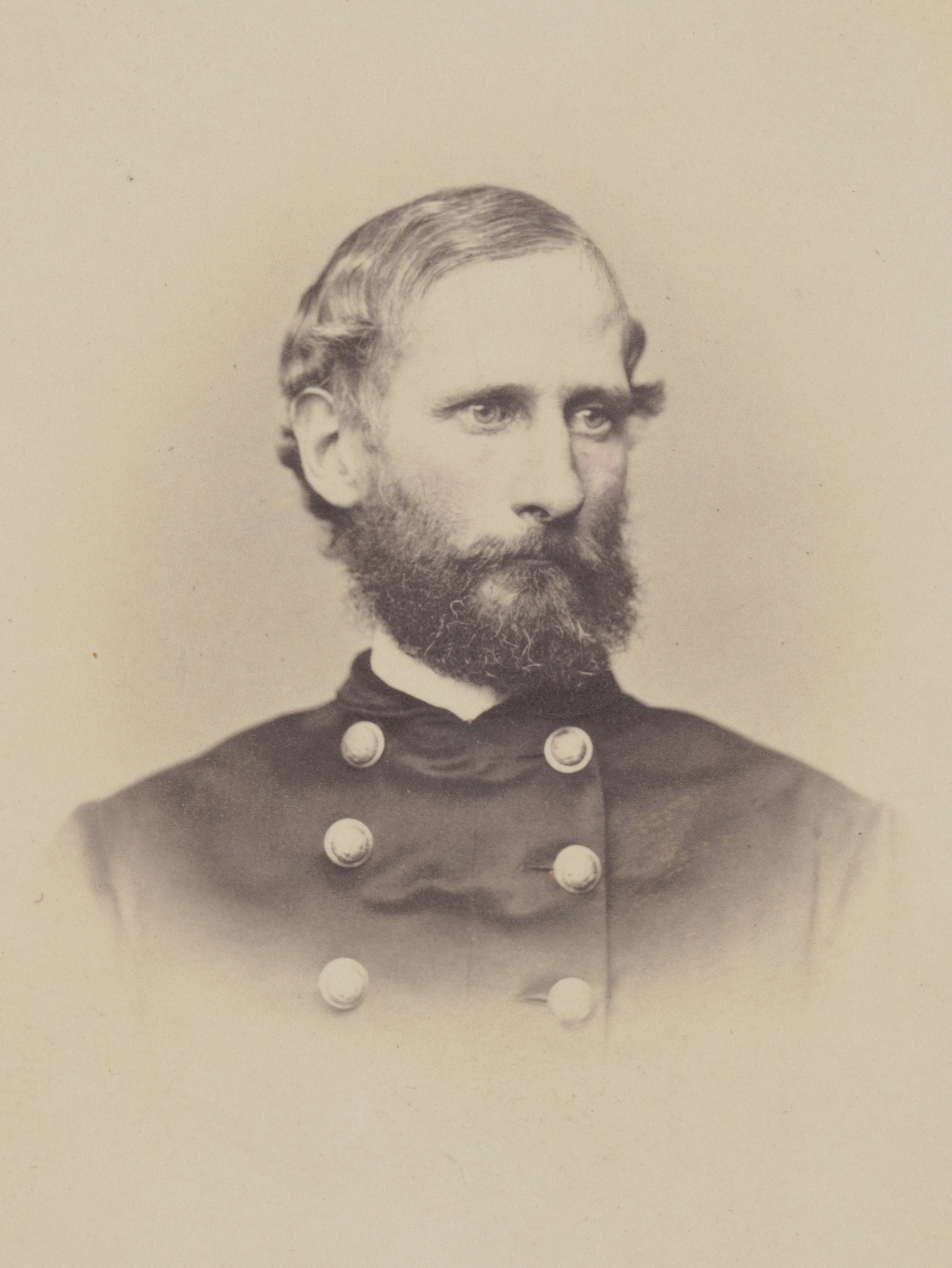
Henry Bryant, 1864

Henry Perkins Bryant (May 12, 1820 – February 2, 1867) was an American medical doctor and naturalist. He collected specimens, particularly birds and mammals, from the Caribbean and North America. A number of subspecies were described from his collections and several were named after him including Bryant's Savannah Sparrow Passerculus sandwichensis alaudinus, Bryant's Golden Warbler Dendroica petechia bryanti, Agelaius phoeniceus bryanti and Bryant's Grassquit Tiaris olivaceus bryanti.

== Early life ==
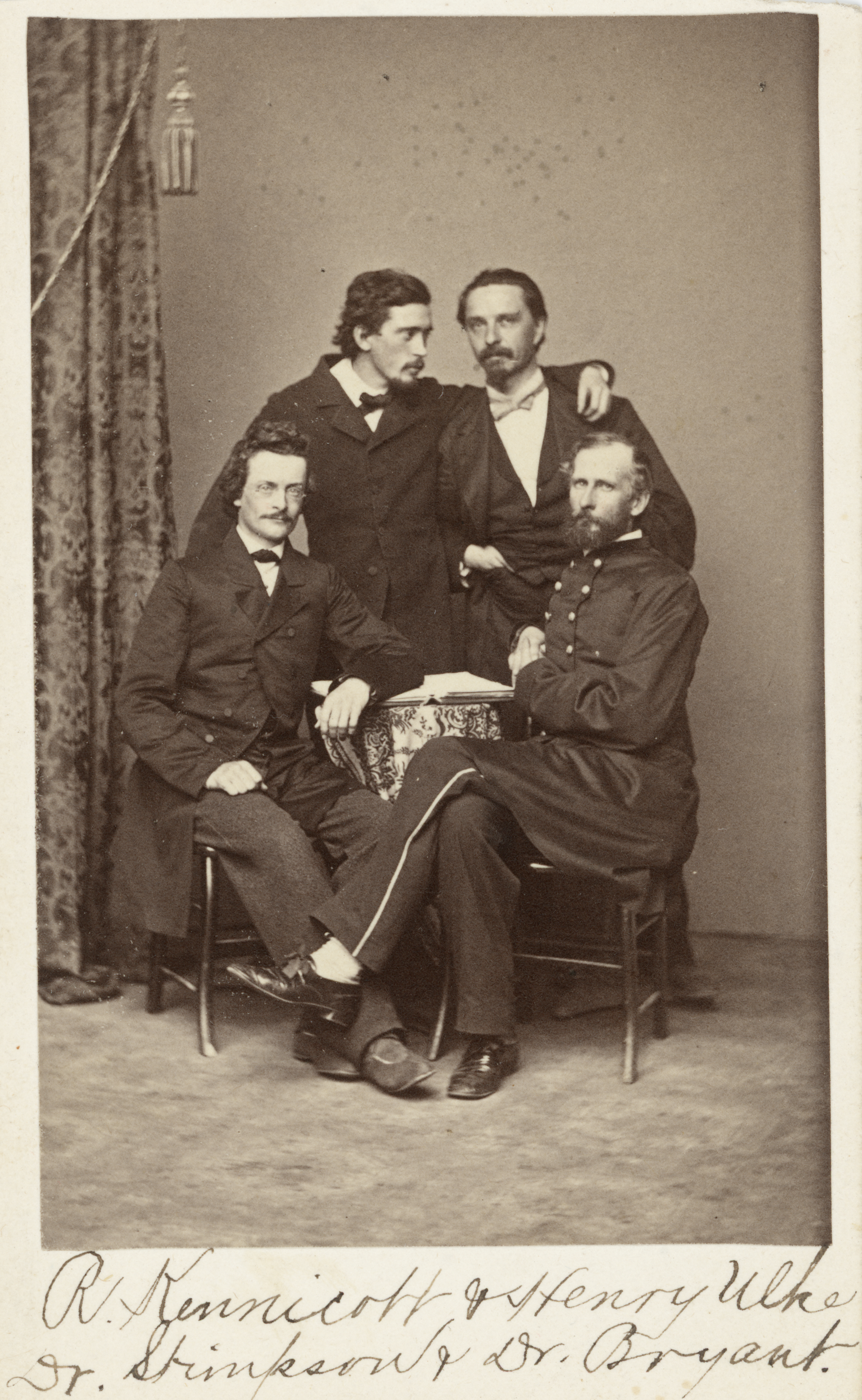
Members of the Megatherium Club, circa 1864.

Bryant was born in Boston, and went to Thayer's School and Welles' school in Cambridge before going to Harvard University in 1836. He received a degree in 1840, and then followed this with medical studies at Tremont Medical School and received his degree from Harvard Medical School in 1843. Following this, he went to Paris to study medicine, but his health broke down while researching at the Hospital Beaujon in Paris. In order to restore his health, he joined the French army in Algeria as a surgeon.

In October 1847, Bryant returned to Boston to work with Dr. Henry Jacob Bigelow as a surgeon, but after a few months his health broke down again. After being forced to abandon medicine because of ill health, Bryant turned to natural history, especially ornithology, which was a childhood passion. Bryant visited nearby Cohasset, Massachusetts for one of his first collecting trips, but he seriously injured his stomach from a fall while landing his boat. After his recovery, he decided to push himself further in an attempt to strengthen his body. His collecting trips became more frequent and more far flung.

Bryant married Elizabeth B. Sohier in 1847 and they had four children. Their son William Sohier Bryant also became a physician.

== Civil War service ==
Bryant took a break from natural history to volunteer as a surgeon during the American Civil War. He accepted an appointment as a surgeon for the 20th Regiment Massachusetts Volunteer Infantry, which was also known as "The Harvard Regiment." By September 1861, Bryant was promoted to brigade surgeon. Soon after, he served on the staff of General Frederick W. Lander until March 2, 1862, when the general died of pneumonia.

After Lander's death, Bryant was appointed Medical Director for General James Shield, a future senator. While serving as this post, Bryant fell off his horse so hard that his knee was nearly amputated. Despite the pain, he continued his duties. In the middle of 1862, he was placed in charge of organizing several hospitals, including Cliffburn Hospital and Lincoln Hospital. However, his mental and physical health collapsed again, and he resigned his commission in May 1863.

== Life after the Civil War ==
After the Civil War ended, Bryant made several trips to France, including to purchase the Frédéric de Lafresnaye collection of birds in 1865, which he presented to the Boston Society of Natural History. This collection contained nearly 9,000 mostly non-American specimen. The unpacking and remounting of the specimen was conducted by younger naturalists, including Charles Johnson Maynard, and took about a year to complete.

In addition to his visits to France, Bryant collected birds in Florida, the Bahamas, Ontario and Labrador, North Carolina, Cuba, Jamaica and Puerto Rico. He was one of the first American ornithologists in the Caribbean.

Bryant died in Puerto Rico on February 2, 1867 during a brief illness on a collecting trip.
