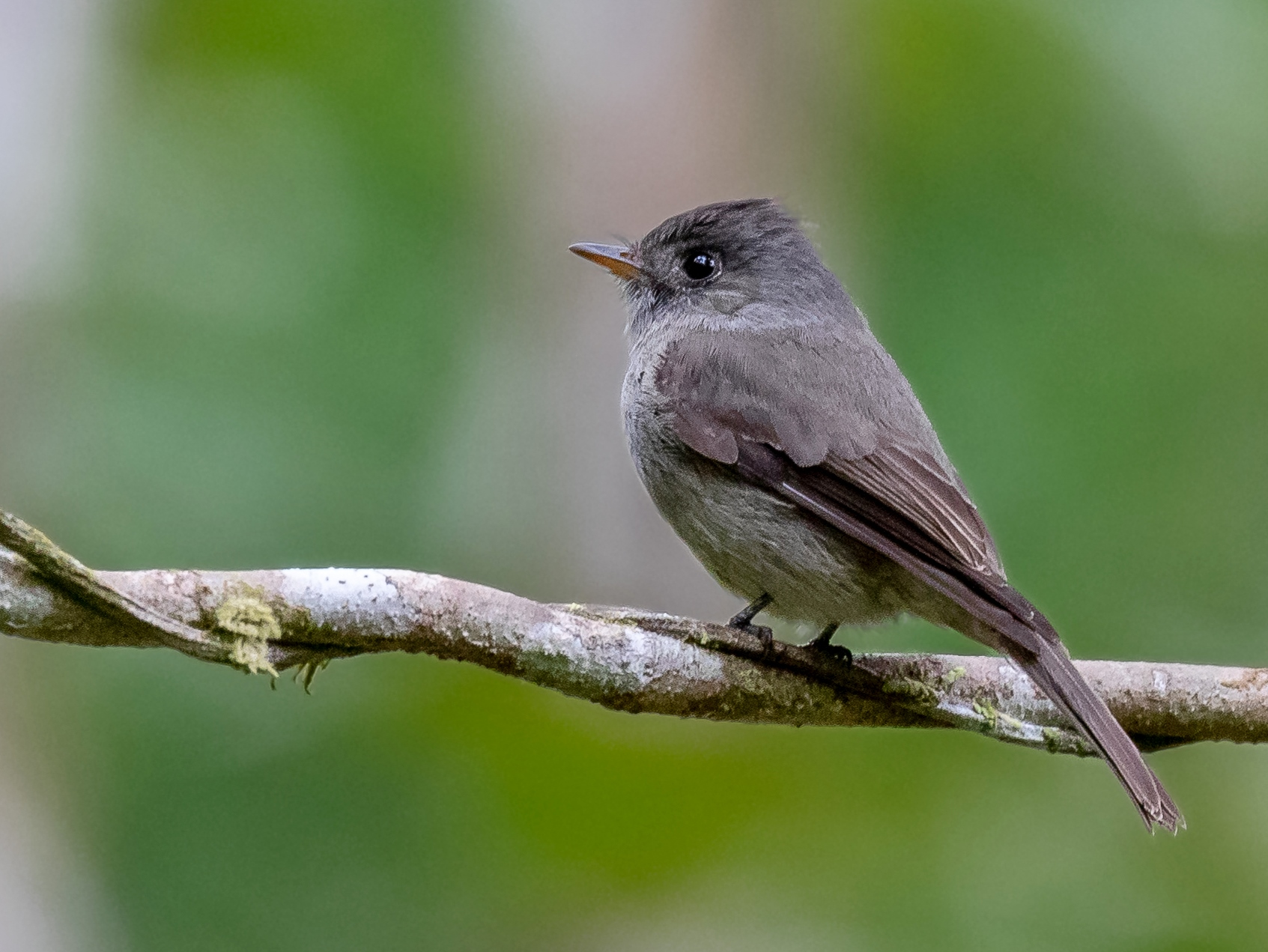

Conservation status
- Least Concern (IUCN 3.1)

Scientific classification
- Kingdom: Animalia
- Phylum: Chordata
- Class: Aves
- Order: Passeriformes
- Family: Tyrannidae
- Genus: Contopus
- Species: C. cinereus

Binomial name
- Contopus cinereus (Spix, 1825)

= Southern tropical pewee =

Species of bird

The southern tropical pewee (Contopus cinereus) is a small passerine bird in the family Tyrannidae, the tyrant flycatchers. It is found in Argentina, Bolivia, Brazil, and Paraguay.

== Taxonomy and systematics ==
The southern tropical pewee's taxonomy is unsettled. The International Ornithological Committee (IOC), the Clements taxonomy, and BirdLife International's Handbook of the Birds of the World (HBW) treat it as a species with two subspecies: the nominate C. c. cinereus (Spix, 1825) and C. c. pallescens (Hellmayr, 1927).

The North and South American Classification Committees of the American Ornithological Society treat those subspecies and six others as the tropical pewee with the binomial Contopus cinereus. In 2016 HBW separated three of the subspecies as the two-subspecies southern tropical pewee (C. cinereus) and the monotypic western tropical pewee (C. punensis). In 2022 Clements recognized the southern tropical pewee as a species and the IOC followed suit in 2023.

== Description ==
The southern tropical pewee is 13.5 to 14.5 cm (5.3 to 5.7 in) long and weighs about 10 to 15 g (0.35 to 0.53 oz). The sexes have the same plumage. Adults of the nominate subspecies have a dark blackish gray crown with a slight crest, white to grayish white lores, and a thin white eye-ring on an otherwise grayish olive face. Their back is sooty olive-gray and their rump and uppertail coverts brownish olive with a hidden white feather tuft on either side of the rump. Their wings are mostly dusky. The wing's secondaries have white to brownish gray edges at the ends and the median and greater coverts have grayish white to brownish gray tips that show as two thin wing bars. Their tail is olive-gray. Their chin and throat are white, their upper breast white with a gray tinge, their lower breast and belly white to yellowish white, and their undertail coverts pale brown. Juveniles have browner upperparts than adults with buff to cinnamon-buff edges on the feathers. Their wing coverts have wide pale cinnamon-buff tips. Their chin is brown. Subspecies C. c. pallescens has a darker crown than the nominate but is otherwise the same. Both subspecies have a dark brown iris, a sepia brown maxilla, a paler and more orangey mandible, and sepia-brown legs and feet.

== Distribution and habitat ==
Subspecies C. c. pallescens of the southern tropical pewee is the more northerly of the two. It is found in central and eastern Brazil roughly bounded by southern Maranhão, Pernambuco, and Mato Grosso do Sul and south through eastern Bolivia and northern Paraguay into northwestern Argentina as far as Tucumán Province. The nominate subspecies is found in southeastern Brazil from Bahia to Santa Catarina and south through central and southeastern Paraguay into northeastern Argentina's Misiones Province. The species, as what is thought to be C. c. pallescens, also occurs as a rare migrant in southeastern Peru.

The southern tropical pewee inhabits a variety of semi-open landscapes including light woodlands, secondary woodlands, plantations, and the edges of semi-deciduous forest. In elevation it mostly occurs below 1,300 m (4,300 ft) but reaches 1,800 m (5,900 ft) in Brazil, 2,000 m (6,600 ft) in Argentina, and exceptionally to 2,850 m (9,400 ft) in Bolivia.

== Behavior ==
=== Movement ===
The southern tropical pewee is mostly a year-round resident. The population in northwestern Argentina appears to be a partial migrant, with what it thought to be subspecies C. c. pallescens reaching southeastern Peru.

=== Feeding ===
The southern tropical pewee apparently feeds only on insects, though details are lacking. It typically forages singly or in pairs. It sits erect on a somewhat open or exposed perch on the forest edge, usually no higher than the forest's mid-level, and captures prey in mid-air with sallies from it ("hawking"). It usually returns to the same perch after a sally and "shivers" its tail upon landing. It rarely joins mixed-species feeding flocks.

=== Breeding ===
The southern tropical pewee's breeding season has not been defined, but all populations breed within the July to November span. Males perform a courtship display in which they squat, jump, and flick their wings and tail. One studied nest was a wide shallow open cup made from lichens, seed down, plant fibers, and green moss lined with softer fibers. The materials are bound together and to a branch with spider silk. One in Argentina was about 10 m (33 ft) above the ground in an Erythrina falcata tree. Both members of a pair defend the nest from larger birds such as thrushes (Turdus) and great kiskadees (Pitangus sulphuratus). The clutch size is two eggs that are dull white with brown and lilac spots. The incubation period, time to fledging, and details of parental care are not known.

=== Vocalization ===
The southern tropical pewee's song is a "clear emphatic whistled pee-heeuw!, repeated at intervals". Its call is a "very short note typically repeated several times...pip..pip..pip..pip..pip....". The song and call have also been written as a "descending tjeuuw" and a "very high, staccato wic wic-" respectively. The species sings and calls at any time of day though more in the morning. It vocalizes from a perch on a bare branch in the forest's mid-story.

== Status ==
The IUCN has assessed the southern tropical pewee as being of Least Concern. It has a large range; its population size is not known and is believed to be stable. No immediate threats have been identified. It "[o]ccurs in many national parks and other protected areas throughout its large range".
