= List of birds of Texas =

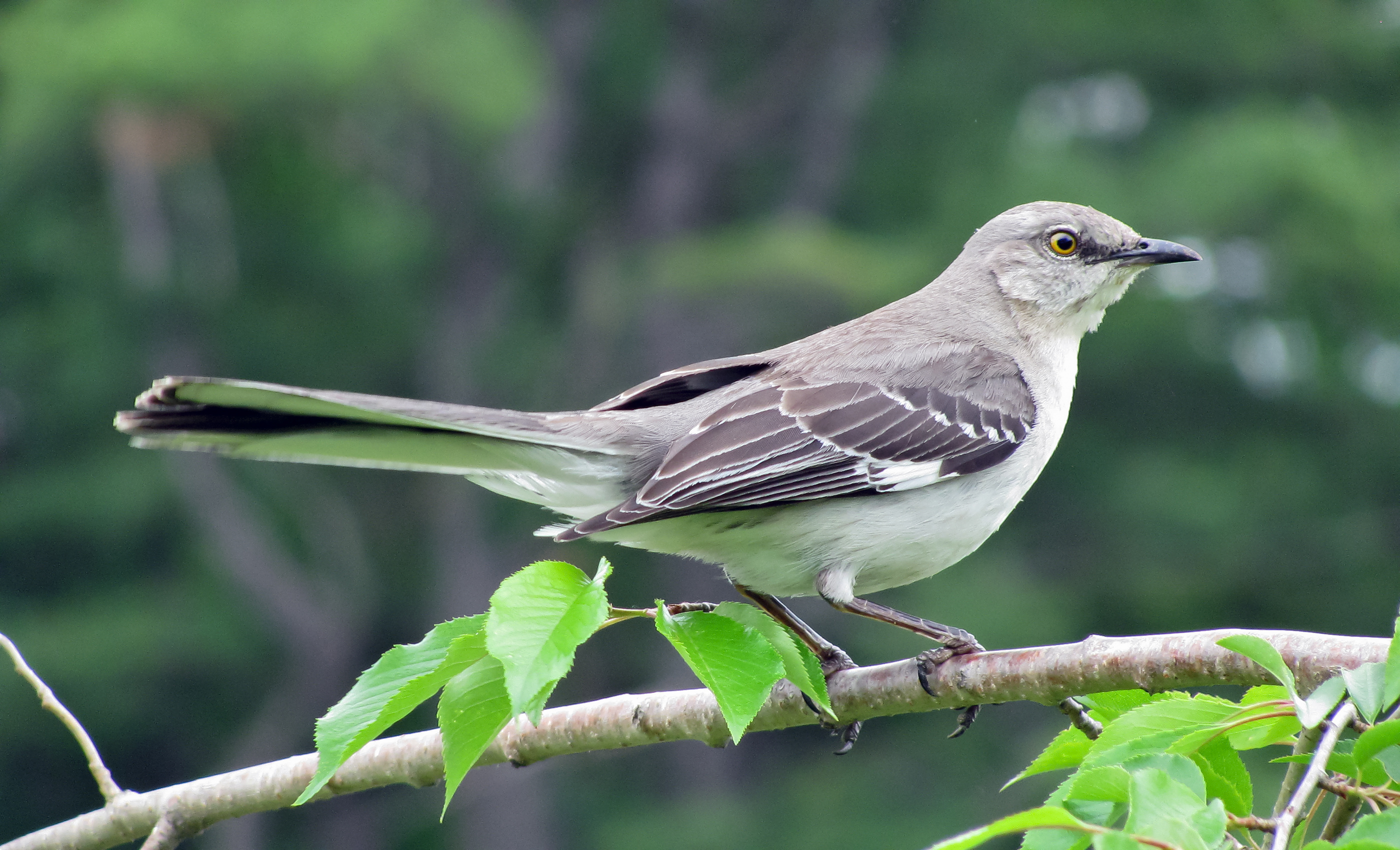
The northern mockingbird is the state bird of Texas.

The list of birds of Texas is the official list of species recorded in the U.S. state of Texas according to the Texas Bird Records Committee (TBRC) of the Texas Ornithological Society. As of January 2024, the list contained 664 species. Of them, 170 are considered review species. Eight species were introduced to Texas, two are known to be extinct and another is thought to be, and a fourth is extirpated and possibly extinct. An additional accidental/historical species has been added from another source. Other additional accidental and hypothetical species have been added from different sources.

This list is presented in the taxonomic sequence of the Check-list of North and Middle American Birds, 7th edition through the 63rd Supplement, published by the American Ornithological Society (AOS). Common and scientific names are also those of the Check-list, except that the common names of families are from the Clements taxonomy because the AOS list does not include them.

Unless otherwise noted, all species listed below are considered to occur regularly in Texas as permanent residents, summer or winter visitors, or migrants. These tags are used to annotate some species:

(R) Review species- species "for which documentation for review is requested for any record" by the TBRC
(I) Introduced – introduced to Texas by humans, directly or indirectly.
(E) Extinct – species which no longer exist
(RI) Reintroduction in progress - per the TBRC, two species are present but have not been reestablished following earlier extirpation
(u) Uncertain – per the TBRC, two species have "stable to increasing populations of introduced/native origin"

== Ducks, geese, and waterfowl ==
Order: Anseriformes Family: Anatidae

Anatidae includes the ducks and most duck-like waterfowl, such as geese and swans. These birds are adapted to an aquatic existence with webbed feet, bills which are flattened to a greater or lesser extent, and feathers that are excellent at shedding water due to special oils.

- White-faced whistling-duck, Dendrocygna viduata (hypothetical)
- Black-bellied whistling-duck, Dendrocygna autumnalis
- West Indian whistling-duck, Dendrocygna arborea (hypothetical)
- Fulvous whistling-duck, Dendrocygna bicolor
- Emperor goose, Anser canagica (accidental)
- Snow goose, Anser caerulescens
- Ross's goose, Anser rossii
- Greater white-fronted goose, Anser albifrons
- Brant, Branta bernicla (R)
- Barnacle goose, Branta leucopsis (accidental)
- Cackling goose, Branta hutchinsii
- Canada goose, Branta canadensis
- Red-breasted goose, Branta ruficollis (accidental) (not on the AOS Check-list)
- Trumpeter swan, Cygnus buccinator (R)
- Tundra swan, Cygnus columbianus
- Whooper swan, Cygnus cygnus (accidental)
- Muscovy duck, Cairina moschata
- Wood duck, Aix sponsa
- Garganey, Spatula querquedula (R)
- Blue-winged teal, Spatula discors
- Cinnamon teal, Spatula cyanoptera
- Northern shoveler, Spatula clypeata
- Gadwall, Mareca strepera
- Eurasian wigeon, Mareca penelope (R)
- American wigeon, Mareca americana
- Mallard, Anas platyrhynchos
- Mexican duck, Anas diazi
- American black duck, Anas rubripes (R)
- Mottled duck, Anas fulvigula
- White-cheeked pintail, Anas bahamensis (R)
- Northern pintail, Anas acuta
- Green-winged teal, Anas crecca
- Canvasback, Aythya valisineria
- Redhead, Aythya americana
- Common pochard, Aythya ferina (hypothetical)
- Ring-necked duck, Aythya collaris
- Tufted duck, Aythya fuligula (accidental)
- Greater scaup, Aythya marila
- Lesser scaup, Aythya affinis
- King eider, Somateria spectabilis (R)
- Common eider, Somateria mollissima (R)
- Harlequin duck, Histrionicus histrionicus (R)
- Surf scoter, Melanitta perspicillata
- White-winged scoter, Melanitta deglandi
- Stejneger's scoter, Melanitta stejnegeri (accidental)
- Black scoter, Melanitta americana
- Long-tailed duck, Clangula hyemalis
- Bufflehead, Bucephala albeola
- Common goldeneye, Bucephala clangula
- Barrow's goldeneye, Bucephala islandica (R)
- Hooded merganser, Lophodytes cucullatus
- Common merganser, Mergus merganser
- Red-breasted merganser, Mergus serrator
- Masked duck, Nomonyx dominicus (R)
- Ruddy duck, Oxyura jamaicensis

== Guans, chachalacas, and curassows ==
Order: Galliformes Family: Cracidae

The chachalacas, guans, and curassows are birds in the family Cracidae. These are large birds, similar in general appearance to turkeys. The guans and curassows live in trees, but the smaller chachalacas are found in more open scrubby habitats. They are generally dull-plumaged, but the curassows and some guans have colorful facial ornaments.

- Plain chachalaca, Ortalis vetula

== New World quail ==
Order: Galliformes Family: Odontophoridae

The New World quails are small, plump terrestrial birds only distantly related to the quails of the Old World, but named for their similar appearance and habits.

- Northern bobwhite, Colinus virginianus
- Scaled quail, Callipepla squamata
- Gambel's quail, Callipepla gambelii
- Montezuma quail, Cyrtonyx montezumae

== Pheasants, grouse, and allies ==
Order: Galliformes Family: Phasianidae

Phasianidae consists of the pheasants and their allies. These are terrestrial species, variable in size but generally plump with broad relatively short wings. Many species are gamebirds or have been domesticated as a food source for humans.

- Wild turkey, Meleagris gallopavo
- Sharp-tailed grouse, Tympanuchus phasianellus (hypothetical)
- Greater prairie-chicken, Tympanuchus cupido (RI)
- Lesser prairie-chicken, Tympanuchus pallidicinctus
- Ring-necked pheasant, Phasianus colchicus (I)

== Flamingos ==
Order: Phoenicopteriformes Family: Phoenicopteridae

Flamingos are gregarious wading birds, usually 3 to 5 feet (0.9 to 1.5 m) tall, found in both the Western and Eastern Hemispheres. Flamingos filter-feed on shellfish and algae. Their oddly shaped beaks are specially adapted to separate mud and silt from the food they consume and, uniquely, are used upside-down.

- American flamingo, Phoenicopterus ruber (R)

== Grebes ==
Order: Podicipediformes Family: Podicipedidae

Grebes are small to medium-large freshwater diving birds. They have lobed toes and are excellent swimmers and divers. However, they have their feet placed far back on the body, making them quite ungainly on land.

- Least grebe, Tachybaptus dominicus
- Pied-billed grebe, Podilymbus podiceps
- Horned grebe, Podiceps auritus
- Red-necked grebe, Podiceps grisegena (R)
- Eared grebe, Podiceps nigricollis
- Western grebe, Aechmorphorus occidentalis
- Clark's grebe, Aechmorphorus clarkii

== Pigeons and doves ==
Order: Columbiformes Family: Columbidae

Pigeons and doves are stout-bodied birds with short necks and short slender bills with a fleshy cere. They feed on seeds, fruit, and plants.

- Rock pigeon, Columba livia (I)
- Common wood pigeon, Columba palumbus (accidental)
- White-crowned pigeon, Patagioenas leucocephala (R)
- Red-billed pigeon, Patagioenas flavirostris
- Band-tailed pigeon, Patagioenas fasciata
- European turtle-dove, Streptopelia turtur (accidental)
- Eurasian collared-dove, Streptopelia decaocto (I)
- Passenger pigeon, Ectopistes migratorius (E)
- Inca dove, Columbina inca
- Common ground dove, Columbina passerina
- Ruddy ground dove, Columbina talpacoti (R)
- Ruddy quail-dove, Geotrygon montana (R)
- Blue ground dove, Claravis pretiosa (hypothetical)
- Gray-fronted dove, Leptotila rufaxilla (hypothetical)
- White-tipped dove, Leptotila verreauxi
- White-winged dove, Zenaida asiatica
- Eared dove, Zenaida auriculata (accidental)
- Zenaida dove, Zenaida aurita (hypothetical)
- Mourning dove, Zenaida macroura

== Cuckoos ==
Order: Cuculiformes Family: Cuculidae

The family Cuculidae includes cuckoos, roadrunners, and anis. These birds are of variable size with slender bodies, long tails, and strong legs.

- Smooth-billed ani, Crotophaga ani (R)
- Groove-billed ani, Crotophaga sulcirostris
- Greater roadrunner, Geococcyx californianus
- Dark-billed cuckoo, Coccyzus melacoryphus (R)
- Yellow-billed cuckoo, Coccyzus americanus
- Mangrove cuckoo, Coccyzus minor (R)
- Black-billed cuckoo, Coccyzus erythropthalmus

== Nightjars and allies ==
Order: Caprimulgiformes Family: Caprimulgidae

Nightjars are medium-sized nocturnal birds that usually nest on the ground. They have long wings, short legs, and very short bills. Most have small feet, of little use for walking, and long pointed wings. Their soft plumage is cryptically colored to resemble bark or leaves.

- Lesser nighthawk, Chordeiles acutipennis
- Common nighthawk, Chordeiles minor
- Antillean nighthawk, Chordeiles gundlachii (hypothetical)
- Common pauraque, Nyctidromus albicollis
- Common poorwill, Phalaenoptilus nuttallii
- Chuck-will's-widow, Antrostomus carolinensis
- Buff-collared nightjar, Antrostomus ridgwayi (hypothetical)
- Eastern whip-poor-will, Antrostomus vociferus
- Mexican whip-poor-will, Antrostomus arizonae

== Swifts ==
Order: Apodiformes Family: Apodidae

The swifts are small birds which spend the majority of their lives flying. These birds have very short legs and never settle voluntarily on the ground, perching instead only on vertical surfaces. Many swifts have long swept-back wings which resemble a crescent or boomerang.

- Black swift, Cypseloides niger (R)
- White-collared swift, Streptoprocne zonaris (R)
- Chimney swift, Chaetura pelagica
- Vaux's swift, Chaetura vauxi (accidental)
- White-throated swift, Aeronautes saxatalis

== Hummingbirds ==
Order: Apodiformes Family: Trochilidae

Hummingbirds are small birds capable of hovering in mid-air due to the rapid flapping of their wings. They are the only birds that can fly backwards.

- Mexican violetear, Colibri thalassinus (R)
- Green-breasted mango, Anthracothorax prevostii (R)
- Black-crested coquette, Lophornis helenae (hypothetical)
- Rivoli's hummingbird, Eugenes fulgens
- Plain-capped starthroat, Heliomaster constantii (hypothetical)
- Blue-throated mountain-gem, Lampornis clemenciae
- Amethyst-throated mountain-gem, Lampornis amethystinus (R)
- Lucifer hummingbird, Calothorax lucifer
- Ruby-throated hummingbird, Archilochus colubris
- Black-chinned hummingbird, Archilochus alexandri
- Anna's hummingbird, Calypte anna
- Costa's hummingbird, Calypte costae (R)
- Calliope hummingbird, Selasphorus calliope
- Rufous hummingbird, Selasphorus rufus
- Allen's hummingbird, Selasphorus sasin
- Broad-tailed hummingbird, Selasphorus platycercus
- Broad-billed hummingbird, Cynanthus latirostris
- White-eared hummingbird, Basilinna leucotis (R)
- Violet-crowned hummingbird, Leucolia violiceps (R)
- Azure-crowned hummingbird, Saucerottia cyanocephala (hypothetical)
- Berylline hummingbird, Saucerottia beryllina (R)
- Antillean crested hummingbird, Orthorhyncus cristatus (hypothetical)
- Buff-bellied hummingbird, Amazilia yucatanensis
- Rufous-tailed hummingbird, Amazilia tzacatl (hypothetical)

== Rails, gallinules, and coots ==
Order: Gruiformes Family: Rallidae

Rallidae is a large family of small to medium-sized birds which includes the rails, crakes, coots, and gallinules. The most typical family members occupy dense vegetation in damp environments near lakes, swamps, or rivers. In general they are shy and secretive birds, making them difficult to observe. Most species have strong legs and long toes which are well adapted to soft uneven surfaces. They tend to have short, rounded wings and to be weak fliers.

- Paint-billed crake, Neocrex erythrops (R)
- Spotted rail, Pardirallus maculatus (R)
- Clapper rail, Rallus crepitans
- King rail, Rallus elegans
- Virginia rail, Rallus limicola
- Sora, Porzana carolina
- Common gallinule, Gallinula galeata
- American coot, Fulica americana
- Purple gallinule, Porphyrio martinicus
- Yellow rail, Coturnicops noveboracensis
- Black rail, Laterallus jamaicensis

== Limpkin ==
Order: Gruiformes Family: Aramidae

The limpkin is an odd bird that looks like a large rail, but is skeletally closer to the cranes. It is found in marshes with some trees or scrub.

- Limpkin, Aramus guarauna (R)

== Cranes ==
Order: Gruiformes Family: Gruidae

Cranes are large, long-legged, and long-necked birds. Unlike the similar-looking but unrelated herons, cranes fly with necks outstretched, not pulled back. Most have elaborate and noisy courting displays or "dances".

- Sandhill crane, Antigone canadensis
- Common crane, Grus grus (R)
- Whooping crane, Grus americana

== Thick-knees ==
Order: Charadriiformes Family: Burhinidae

The thick-knees are a group of waders found worldwide within the tropical zone, with some species also breeding in temperate Europe and Australia. They are medium to large waders with strong black or yellow-black bills, large yellow eyes, and cryptic plumage. Despite being classed as waders, most species have a preference for arid or semi-arid habitats.

- Double-striped thick-knee, Burhinus bistriatus (R)

== Stilts and avocets ==
Order: Charadriiformes Family: Recurvirostridae

Recurvirostridae is a family of large wading birds which includes the avocets and stilts. The avocets have long legs and long up-curved bills. The stilts have extremely long legs and long, thin, straight bills.

- Black-necked stilt, Himantopus mexicanus
- American avocet, Recurvirostra americana

== Oystercatchers ==
Order: Charadriiformes Family: Haematopodidae

The oystercatchers are large, obvious, and noisy plover-like birds, with strong bills used for smashing or prying open molluscs.

- American oystercatcher, Haematopus palliatus
- Black oystercatcher, Haematopus bachmani (accidental)

== Plovers and lapwings ==
Order: Charadriiformes Family: Charadriidae

The family Charadriidae includes the plovers, dotterels, and lapwings. They are small to medium-sized birds with compact bodies, short thick necks, and long, usually pointed, wings. They are found in open country worldwide, mostly in habitats near water.

- Southern lapwing, Vanellus chilensis (accidental)
- Black-bellied plover, Pluvialis squatarola
- European golden-plover, Pluvialis apricaria (hypothetical)
- American golden-plover, Pluvialis dominica
- Pacific golden-plover, Pluvialis fulva (R)
- Eurasian dotterel, Charadrius morinellus (hypothetical)
- Killdeer, Charadrius vociferus
- Semipalmated plover, Charadrius semipalmatus
- Piping plover, Charadrius melodus
- Wilson's plover, Charadrius wilsonia
- Collared plover, Charadrius collaris (R)
- Snowy plover, Charadrius nivosus
- Mountain plover, Charadrius montanus

== Jacanas ==
Order: Charadriiformes Family: Jacanidae

The jacanas are a family of waders found worldwide within the tropical zone. They are identifiable by their huge feet and claws which enable them to walk on floating vegetation in the shallow lakes that are their preferred habitat.

- Northern jacana, Jacana spinosa (R)

== Sandpipers and allies ==
Order: Charadriiformes Family: Scolopacidae

Scolopacidae is a large diverse family of small to medium-sized shorebirds including the sandpipers, curlews, godwits, shanks, tattlers, woodcocks, snipes, dowitchers, and phalaropes. The majority of these species eat small invertebrates picked out of the mud or soil. Different lengths of legs and bills enable multiple species to feed in the same habitat, particularly on the coast, without direct competition for food.

- Upland sandpiper, Bartramia longicauda
- Whimbrel, Numenius phaeopus
- Eskimo curlew, Numenius borealis (R; believed extinct)
- Long-billed curlew, Numenius americanus
- Bar-tailed godwit, Limosa lapponica (R)
- Black-tailed godwit, Limosa limosa (R)
- Hudsonian godwit, Limosa haemastica
- Marbled godwit, Limosa fedoa
- Ruddy turnstone, Arenaria interpres
- Black turnstone, Arenaria melanocephala (R)
- Red knot, Calidris canutus
- Surfbird, Calidris virgata (R)
- Ruff, Calidris pugnax (R)
- Sharp-tailed sandpiper, Calidris acuminata (R)
- Stilt sandpiper, Calidris himantopus
- Curlew sandpiper, Calidris ferruginea (R)
- Red-necked stint, Calidris ruficollis (R)
- Sanderling, Calidris alba
- Dunlin, Calidris alpina
- Purple sandpiper, Calidris maritima (R)
- Baird's sandpiper, Calidris bairdii
- Little stint, Calidris minuta (accidental)
- Least sandpiper, Calidris minutilla
- White-rumped sandpiper, Calidris fuscicollis
- Buff-breasted sandpiper, Calidris subruficollis
- Pectoral sandpiper, Calidris melanotos
- Semipalmated sandpiper, Calidris pusilla
- Western sandpiper, Calidris mauri
- Short-billed dowitcher, Limnodromus griseus
- Long-billed dowitcher, Limnodromus scolopaceus
- American woodcock, Scolopax minor
- Wilson's snipe, Gallinago delicata
- Spotted sandpiper, Actitis macularia
- Solitary sandpiper, Tringa solitaria
- Wandering tattler, Tringa incana (R)
- Lesser yellowlegs, Tringa flavipes
- Willet, Tringa semipalmata
- Spotted redshank, Tringa erythropus (R)
- Common redshank, Tringa totanus (hypothetical)
- Greater yellowlegs, Tringa melanoleuca
- Wilson's phalarope, Phalaropus tricolor
- Red-necked phalarope, Phalaropus lobatus
- Red phalarope, Phalaropus fulicarius (R)

== Skuas and jaegers ==
Order: Charadriiformes Family: Stercorariidae

Skuas and jaegers are in general medium to large birds, typically with gray or brown plumage, often with white markings on the wings. They have longish bills with hooked tips and webbed feet with sharp claws. They look like large dark gulls, but have a fleshy cere above the upper mandible. They are strong, acrobatic fliers.

- South polar skua, Stercorarius maccormicki (R)
- Pomarine jaeger, Stercorarius pomarinus
- Parasitic jaeger, Stercorarius parasiticus
- Long-tailed jaeger, Stercorarius longicaudus (R)

== Gulls, terns, and skimmers ==
Order: Charadriiformes Family: Laridae

Laridae is a family of medium to large seabirds and includes gulls, terns, and skimmers. Gulls are typically gray or white, often with black markings on the head or wings. They have stout, longish bills and webbed feet. Terns are a group of generally medium to large seabirds typically with gray or white plumage, often with black markings on the head. Most terns hunt fish by diving but some pick insects off the surface of fresh water. Terns are generally long-lived birds, with several species known to live in excess of 30 years. Skimmers are a small family of tropical tern-like birds. They have an elongated lower mandible which they use to feed by flying low over the water surface and skimming the water for small fish.

- Black-legged kittiwake, Rissa tridactyla
- Sabine's gull, Xema sabini
- Bonaparte's gull, Chroicocephalus philadelphia
- Black-headed gull, Chroicocephalus ridibundus (R)
- Little gull, Hydrocoleus minutus
- Laughing gull, Leucophaeus atricilla
- Franklin's gull, Leucophaeus pipixcan
- Black-tailed gull, Larus crassirostris (R)
- Heermann's gull, Larus heermanni (R)
- Common gull, Larus canus (accidental)
- Short-billed gull, Larus brachyrhynchus (R)
- Ring-billed gull, Larus delawarensis
- Western gull, Larus occidentalis (R)
- Yellow-footed gull, Larus livens (accidental)
- California gull, Larus californicus
- American herring gull, Larus smithsonianus
- European herring gull, Larus argentatus (accidental)
- Yellow-legged gull, Larus cachinnans (R)
- Iceland gull, Larus glaucoides
- Lesser black-backed gull, Larus fuscus
- Slaty-backed gull, Larus schistisagus (R)
- Glaucous-winged gull, Larus glaucescens (R)
- Glaucous gull, Larus hyperboreus
- Great black-backed gull, Larus marinus (R)
- Kelp gull, Larus dominicanus (R)
- Brown noddy, Anous stolidus (R)
- Black noddy, Anous minutus (R)
- Blue-gray noddy, Anous ceruleus (hypothetical)
- Sooty tern, Onychoprion fuscatus
- Bridled tern, Onychoprion anaethetus
- Least tern, Sternula antillarum
- Gull-billed tern, Gelochelidon nilotica
- Caspian tern, Hydroprogne caspia
- Black tern, Chlidonias niger
- Roseate tern, Sterna dougallii (R)
- Common tern, Sterna hirundo
- Arctic tern, Sterna paradisaea (R)
- Forster's tern, Sterna forsteri
- Royal tern, Thalasseus maximus
- Sandwich tern, Thalasseus sandvicensis
- Elegant tern, Thalasseus elegans (R)
- Black skimmer, Rynchops niger

== Tropicbirds ==
Order: Phaethontiformes Family: Phaethontidae

Tropicbirds are slender white birds of tropical oceans with exceptionally long central tail feathers. Their long wings have black markings, as does the head.

- White-tailed tropicbird, Phaethon lepturus (R)
- Red-billed tropicbird, Phaethon rubricauda (R)

== Loons ==
Order: Gaviiformes Family: Gaviidae

Loons are aquatic birds, the size of a large duck, to which they are unrelated. Their plumage is largely gray or black, and they have spear-shaped bills. Loons swim well and fly adequately, but are almost hopeless on land, because their legs are placed towards the rear of the body.

- Red-throated loon, Gavia stellata
- Arctic loon, Gavia arctica (hypothetical)
- Pacific loon, Gavia pacifica
- Common loon, Gavia immer
- Yellow-billed loon, Gavia adamsii (R)

== Albatrosses ==
Order: Procellariiformes Family: Diomedeidae

The albatrosses are among the largest of flying birds, and the great albatrosses of the genus Diomedea have the largest wingspans of any extant birds.

- Yellow-nosed albatross, Thalassarche chlororhynchos (R)

== Southern storm-petrels ==
Order: Procellariiformes Family: Oceanitidae

The storm-petrels are the smallest seabirds, relatives of the petrels, feeding on planktonic crustaceans and small fish picked from the surface, typically while hovering. The flight is fluttering and sometimes bat-like. Until 2018, this family's three species were included with the other storm-petrels in family Hydrobatidae.

- Wilson's storm-petrel, Oceanites oceanicus (R)

== Northern storm-petrels ==
Order: Procellariiformes Family: Hydrobatidae

Though the members of this family are similar in many respects to the southern storm-petrels, including their general appearance and habits, there are enough genetic differences to warrant their placement in a separate family.

- Leach's storm-petrel, Hydrobates leucorhous (R)
- Band-rumped storm-petrel, Hydrobates castro

== Shearwaters and petrels ==
Order: Procellariiformes Family: Procellariidae

The procellariids are the main group of medium-sized "true petrels", characterized by united nostrils with medium septum and a long outer functional primary.

- Trindade petrel, Pterodroma arminjoniana (R)
- Black-capped petrel, Pterodroma hasitata (R)
- Stejneger's petrel, Pterodroma longirostris (R)
- White-chinned petrel, Procellaria aequinoctialis (R)
- Parkinson's petrel, Procellaria parkinsoni (hypothetical)
- Cory's shearwater, Calonectris diomedea
- Wedge-tailed shearwater, Ardenna pacifica (accidental)
- Sooty shearwater, Ardenna griseus (R)
- Great shearwater, Ardenna gravis (R)
- Manx shearwater, Puffinus puffinus (R)
- Sargasso shearwater, Puffinus lherminieri

== Storks ==
Order: Ciconiiformes Family: Ciconiidae

Storks are large, heavy, long-legged, long-necked wading birds with long stout bills and wide wingspans. They lack the powder down that other wading birds such as herons, spoonbills, and ibises use to clean off fish slime. Storks lack a pharynx and are mute.

- Jabiru, Jabiru mycteria (R)
- Wood stork, Mycteria americana

== Frigatebirds ==
Order: Suliformes Family: Fregatidae

Frigatebirds are large seabirds usually found over tropical oceans. They are large, black, or black-and-white, with long wings and deeply forked tails. The males have colored inflatable throat pouches. They do not swim or walk and cannot take off from a flat surface. Having the largest wingspan-to-body-weight ratio of any bird, they are essentially aerial, able to stay aloft for more than a week.

- Lesser frigatebird, Fregata ariel (accidental)
- Ascension frigatebird, Fregata aquila (hypothetical) (not on the AOS Check-list)
- Magnificent frigatebird, Fregata magnificens
- Great frigatebird, Fregata minor (hypothetical)

== Boobies and gannets ==
Order: Suliformes Family: Sulidae

The sulids comprise the gannets and boobies. Both groups are medium-large coastal seabirds that plunge-dive for fish.

- Masked booby, Sula dactylatra
- Blue-footed booby, Sula nebouxii (R)
- Brown booby, Sula leucogaster
- Red-footed booby, Sula sula (R)
- Northern gannet, Morus bassanus

== Anhingas ==
Order: Suliformes Family: Anhingidae

Anhingas are cormorant-like water birds with very long necks and long straight beaks. They are fish eaters which often swim with only their neck above the water.

- Anhinga, Anhinga anhinga

== Cormorants and shags ==
Order: Suliformes Family: Phalacrocoracidae

Cormorants are medium-to-large aquatic birds, usually with mainly dark plumage and areas of colored skin on the face. The bill is long, thin, and sharply hooked. Their feet are four-toed and webbed.

- Great cormorant, Phalacrocorax carbo (hypothetical)
- Double-crested cormorant, Nannopterum auritum
- Neotropic cormorant, Nannopterum brasilianum
- Red-legged cormorant, Poikilocarbo gaimardi (hypothetical) (not on the AOS Check-list)

== Pelicans ==
Order: Pelecaniformes Family: Pelecanidae

Pelicans are very large water birds with a distinctive pouch under their beak. Like other birds in the order Pelecaniformes, they have four webbed toes.

- American white pelican, Pelecanus erythrorhynchos
- Brown pelican, Pelecanus occidentalis

== Herons, egrets, and bitterns ==
Order: Pelecaniformes Family: Ardeidae

The family Ardeidae contains the herons, egrets, and bitterns. Herons and egrets are medium to large wading birds with long necks and legs. Bitterns tend to be shorter necked and more secretive. Members of Ardeidae fly with their necks retracted, unlike other long-necked birds such as storks, ibises, and spoonbills.

- American bittern, Botaurus lentiginosus
- Least bittern, Ixobrychus exilis
- Bare-throated tiger-heron, Tigrisoma mexicanum (R)
- Great blue heron, Ardea herodias
- Great egret, Ardea alba
- Little egret, Egretta garzetta (hypothetical)
- Snowy egret, Egretta thula
- Little blue heron, Egretta caerulea
- Tricolored heron, Egretta tricolor
- Reddish egret, Egretta rufescens
- Cattle egret, Bubulcus ibis
- Green heron, Butorides virescens
- Black-crowned night-heron, Nycticorax nycticorax
- Yellow-crowned night-heron, Nyctanassa violacea

== Ibises and spoonbills ==
Order: Pelecaniformes Family: Threskiornithidae

The family Threskiornithidae includes the ibises and spoonbills. They have long, broad wings. Their bodies tend to be elongated, the neck more so, with rather long legs. The bill is also long, decurved in the case of the ibises, straight and distinctively flattened in the spoonbills.

- White ibis, Eudocimus albus
- Scarlet ibis, Eudocimus ruber (hypothetical)
- Glossy ibis, Plegadis falcinellus
- White-faced ibis, Plegadis chihi
- Roseate spoonbill, Platalea ajaja

== New World vultures ==
Order: Cathartiformes Family: Cathartidae

The New World vultures are not closely related to Old World vultures, but superficially resemble them because of convergent evolution. Like the Old World vultures, they are scavengers. However, unlike Old World vultures, which find carcasses by sight, New World vultures have a good sense of smell with which they locate carcasses.

- Black vulture, Coragyps atratus
- Turkey vulture, Cathartes aura
- Lesser yellow-headed vulture, Cathartes burrovianus (accidental)

== Osprey ==
Order: Accipitriformes Family: Pandionidae

Pandionidae is a monotypic family of fish-eating birds of prey. Its single species possesses a very large and powerful hooked beak, strong legs, strong talons, and keen eyesight.

- Osprey, Pandion haliaetus

== Hawks, eagles, and kites ==
Order: Accipitriformes Family: Accipitridae

Accipitridae is a family of birds of prey which includes hawks, eagles, kites, harriers, and Old World vultures. These birds have very large powerful hooked beaks for tearing flesh from their prey, strong legs, powerful talons, and keen eyesight.

- White-tailed kite, Elanus leucurus
- Hook-billed kite, Chondrohierax uncinatus
- Swallow-tailed kite, Elanoides forficatus
- Golden eagle, Aquila chrysaetos
- Double-toothed kite, Harpagus bidentatus (R)
- Northern harrier, Circus hudsonius
- Sharp-shinned hawk, Accipiter striatus
- Cooper's hawk, Accipiter cooperii
- American goshawk, Accipiter atricapillus (R)
- Bald eagle, Haliaeetus leucocephalus
- Mississippi kite, Ictinia mississippiensis
- Plumbeous kite, Ictinia plumbea (accidental?)
- Black-collared hawk, Busarellus nigricollis (accidental)
- Steller's sea-eagle, Haliaeetus pelagicus (R)
- Crane hawk, Geranospiza caerulescens (R)
- Snail kite, Rostrhamus sociabilis (R)
- Common black hawk, Buteogallus anthracinus
- Great black hawk, Buteogallus urubitinga (R)
- Roadside hawk, Rupornis magnirostris (R)
- Harris's hawk, Parabuteo unicinctus
- White-tailed hawk, Geranoaetus albicaudatus
- Gray hawk, Buteo plagiatus
- Red-shouldered hawk, Buteo lineatus
- Broad-winged hawk, Buteo platypterus
- White-throated hawk, Buteo albigula (accidental) (not on the AOS Check-list)
- Short-tailed hawk, Buteo brachyurus (R)
- Swainson's hawk, Buteo swainsoni
- Zone-tailed hawk, Buteo albonotatus
- Red-tailed hawk, Buteo jamaicensis
- Rough-legged hawk, Buteo lagopus
- Ferruginous hawk, Buteo regalis

== Barn-owls ==
Order: Strigiformes Family: Tytonidae

Owls in the family Tytonidae are medium to large owls with large heads and characteristic heart-shaped faces.

- Barn owl, Tyto alba

== Owls ==
Order: Strigiformes Family: Strigidae

Typical or "true" owls are small to large solitary nocturnal birds of prey. They have large forward-facing eyes and ears, a hawk-like beak, and a conspicuous circle of feathers around each eye called a facial disk.

- Flammulated owl, Psiloscops flammeolus
- Whiskered screech-owl, Megascops trichopsis (accidental)
- Western screech-owl, Megascops kennicottii
- Eastern screech-owl, Megascops asio
- Great horned owl, Bubo virginianus
- Snowy owl, Bubo scandiacus (R)
- Northern hawk owl, Surnia ulula (accidental)
- Northern pygmy-owl, Glaucidium gnoma (R)
- Ferruginous pygmy-owl, Glaucidium brasilianum
- Elf owl, Micrathene whitneyi
- Burrowing owl, Athene cunicularia
- Mottled owl, Strix virgata (R)
- Spotted owl, Strix occidentalis
- Barred owl, Strix varia
- Great gray owl, Strix nebulosa (accidental)
- Long-eared owl, Asio otus
- Stygian owl, Asio stygius (R)
- Short-eared owl, Asio flammeus
- Boreal owl, Aegolius funereus (accidental)
- Northern saw-whet owl, Aegolius acadicus (R)

== Trogons ==
Order: Trogoniformes Family: Trogonidae

Trogons are residents of tropical forests worldwide with the greatest diversity in Central and South America. They feed on insects and fruit, and their broad bills and weak legs reflect their diet and arboreal habits.

- Elegant trogon, Trogon elegans (R)

== Kingfishers ==
Order: Coraciiformes Family: Alcedinidae

Kingfishers are medium-sized birds with large heads, long, pointed bills, short legs, and stubby tails.

- Ringed kingfisher, Megaceryle torquata
- Belted kingfisher, Megaceryle alcyon
- Amazon kingfisher, Chloroceryle amazona (R)
- Green kingfisher, Chloroceryle americana

== Woodpeckers ==
Order: Piciformes Family: Picidae

Woodpeckers are small to medium-sized birds with chisel-like beaks, short legs, stiff tails, and long tongues used for capturing insects. Some species have feet with two toes pointing forward and two backward, while several species have only three toes. Many woodpeckers have the habit of tapping noisily on tree trunks with their beaks.

- Lewis's woodpecker, Melanerpes lewis
- Red-headed woodpecker, Melanerpes erythrocephalus
- Acorn woodpecker, Melanerpes formicivorus
- Gila woodpecker, Melanerpes uropygialis (hypothetical)
- Golden-fronted woodpecker, Melanerpes aurifrons
- Red-bellied woodpecker, Melanerpes carolinus
- Yellow-fronted woodpecker, Melanerpes flavifrons (accidental) (not on the AOS Check-list)
- Williamson's sapsucker, Sphyrapicus thyroideus
- Yellow-bellied sapsucker, Sphyrapicus varius
- Red-naped sapsucker, Sphyrapicus nuchalis
- Red-breasted sapsucker, Sphyrapicus ruber (R)
- American three-toed woodpecker, Picoides dorsalis (hypothetical)
- Downy woodpecker, Dryobates pubescens
- Nuttall's woodpecker, Dryobates nuttallii (accidental)
- Ladder-backed woodpecker, Dryobates scalaris
- Red-cockaded woodpecker, Dryobates borealis
- Hairy woodpecker, Dryobates villosus
- Arizona woodpecker, Dryobates arizonae (hypothetical)
- Northern flicker, Colaptes auratus
- Pileated woodpecker, Dryocopus pileatus
- Lineated woodpecker, Dryocopus lineatus (hypothetical)
- Ivory-billed woodpecker, Campephilus principalis (R) (Note: The ivory-billed woodpecker is considered extirpated from Texas, and is possibly extinct; see the species' article for the controversy surrounding it.)

== Falcons and caracaras ==
Order: Falconiformes Family: Falconidae

Falconidae is a family of diurnal birds of prey, notably the falcons and caracaras. They differ from hawks, eagles, and kites in that they kill with their beaks instead of their talons.

- Laughing falcon, Herpetotheres cachinnans (hypothetical)
- Collared forest-falcon, Micrastur semitorquatus (R)
- Crested caracara, Caracara plancus
- Yellow-headed caracara, Milvago chimachima (hypothetical)
- American kestrel, Falco sparverius
- Merlin, Falco columbarius
- Aplomado falcon, Falco femoralis (RI)
- Bat falcon, Falco rufigularis (R)
- Gyrfalcon, Falco rusticolus (R)
- Peregrine falcon, Falco peregrinus
- Prairie falcon, Falco mexicanus

== New World and African parrots ==
Order: Psittaciformes Family: Psittacidae

Characteristic features of parrots include a strong curved bill, an upright stance, strong legs, and clawed zygodactyl feet. Many parrots are vividly colored, and some are multi-colored. In size they range from 8 cm (3.1 in) to 1 m (3.3 ft) in length. Most of the more than 150 species in this family are found in the New World.

- Monk parakeet, Myiopsitta monachus (I)
- Carolina parakeet, Conuropsis carolinensis (E)
- Green parakeet, Psittacara holochlorus (u)
- Thick-billed parrot, Rhynchopsitta pachyrhyncha (accidental/historical) (Note: There are one or two 19th century records of thick-billed parrot in the state.)
- Red-crowned parrot, Amazona viridigenalis (u)

== Cotingas ==
Order: Passeriformes Family: Cotingidae

The cotingas are birds of forests or forest edges in tropical South America. Comparatively little is known about this diverse group, although all have broad bills with hooked tips, rounded wings, and strong legs. The males of many of the species are brightly colored or decorated with plumes or wattles.

- Rufous piha, Lipaugus unirufus (hypothetical)

== Tityras and allies ==
Order: Passeriformes Family: Tityridae

Tityridae is family of suboscine passerine birds found in forest and woodland in the Neotropics. The approximately 30 species in this family were formerly lumped with the families Pipridae and Cotingidae. They are small to medium-sized birds.

- Masked tityra, Tityra semifasciata (R)
- Gray-collared becard, Pachyramphus major (accidental)
- Rose-throated becard, Pachyramphus aglaiae (R)

== Tyrant flycatchers ==
Order: Passeriformes Family: Tyrannidae

Tyrant flycatchers are Passerine birds which occur throughout North and South America. They superficially resemble the Old World flycatchers, but are more robust and have stronger bills. They do not have the sophisticated vocal capabilities of the songbirds. Most, but not all, are rather plain. As the name implies, most are insectivorous.

- Ochre-bellied flycatcher, Mionectes oleagineus (hypothetical)
- Northern beardless-tyrannulet, Camptostoma imberbe
- Greenish elaenia, Myiopagis viridicata (R)
- Small-billed elaenia, Elaenia parvirostris (R)
- White-crested elaenia, Elaenia albiceps (R)
- Dusky-capped flycatcher, Myiarchus tuberculifer
- Ash-throated flycatcher, Myiarchus cinerascens
- Nutting's flycatcher, Myiarchus nuttingi (R)
- Great crested flycatcher, Myiarchus crinitus
- Brown-crested flycatcher, Myiarchus tyrannulus
- Great kiskadee, Pitangus sulphuratus
- Cattle tyrant, Machetornis rixosa (accidental)
- Rusty-margined flycatcher, Myiozetetes cayanensis (hypothetical)
- Social flycatcher, Myiozetetes similis (R)
- Sulphur-bellied flycatcher, Myiodynastes luteiventris (R)
- Piratic flycatcher, Legatus leucophaius (R)
- Variegated flycatcher, Empidonomus varius (R)
- Tropical kingbird, Tyrannus melancholicus
- Couch's kingbird, Tyrannus couchii
- Cassin's kingbird, Tyrannus vociferans
- Thick-billed kingbird, Tyrannus crassirostris (R)
- Western kingbird, Tyrannus verticalis
- Eastern kingbird, Tyrannus tyrannus
- Gray kingbird, Tyrannus dominicensis (R)
- Scissor-tailed flycatcher, Tyrannus forficatus
- Fork-tailed flycatcher, Tyrannus savana (R)
- Tufted flycatcher, Mitrephanes phaeocercus (R)
- Olive-sided flycatcher, Contopus cooperi
- Greater pewee, Contopus pertinax (R)
- Western wood-pewee, Contopus sordidulus
- Eastern wood-pewee, Contopus virens
- Cuban pewee, Contopus caribaeus (hypothetical)
- Yellow-bellied flycatcher, Empidonax flaviventris
- Acadian flycatcher, Empidonax virescens
- Alder flycatcher, Empidonax alnorum
- Willow flycatcher, Empidonax traillii
- Least flycatcher, Empidonax minimus
- Hammond's flycatcher, Empidonax hammondii
- Gray flycatcher, Empidonax wrightii
- Dusky flycatcher, Empidonax oberholseri
- Western flycatcher, Empidonax difficilis
- Buff-breasted flycatcher, Empidonax fulvifrons (R)
- Black phoebe, Sayornis nigricans
- Eastern phoebe, Sayornis phoebe
- Say's phoebe, Sayornis saya
- Vermilion flycatcher, Pyrocephalus rubinus

== Antbirds ==
Order: Passeriformes Family: Thamnophilidae

The antbirds are a large family of small passerine birds of subtropical and tropical Central and South America. They are forest birds which tend to feed on insects on or near the ground.

- Barred antshrike, Thamnophilus doliatus (R)

== Vireos, shrike-babblers, and erpornis ==
Order: Passeriformes Family: Vireonidae

The vireos are a group of small to medium-sized passerine birds mostly restricted to the New World, though a few other species in the family are found in Asia. They are typically greenish in color and resemble wood-warblers apart from their heavier bills.

- Black-capped vireo, Vireo atricapilla
- White-eyed vireo, Vireo griseus
- Bell's vireo, Vireo bellii
- Gray vireo, Vireo vicinior
- Hutton's vireo, Vireo huttoni
- Yellow-throated vireo, Vireo flavifrons
- Cassin's vireo, Vireo cassinii
- Blue-headed vireo, Vireo solitarius
- Plumbeous vireo, Vireo plumbeus
- Philadelphia vireo, Vireo philadelphicus
- Warbling vireo, Vireo gilvus
- Red-eyed vireo, Vireo olivaceus
- Yellow-green vireo, Vireo flavoviridis
- Black-whiskered vireo, Vireo altiloquus (R)
- Yucatan vireo, Vireo magister (R)

== Shrikes ==
Order: Passeriformes Family: Laniidae

Shrikes are passerine birds known for their habit of catching other birds and small animals and impaling the uneaten portions of their bodies on thorns. A shrike's beak is hooked, like that of a typical bird of prey.

- Loggerhead shrike, Lanius ludovicianus
- Northern shrike, Lanius borealis

== Crows, jays, and magpies ==
Order: Passeriformes Family: Corvidae

The family Corvidae includes crows, ravens, jays, choughs, magpies, treepies, nutcrackers, and ground jays. Corvids are above average in size among the Passeriformes, and some of the larger species show high levels of intelligence.

- Brown jay, Psilorhinus morio (R)
- Green jay, Cyanocorax yncas
- San Blas jay, Cyanocorax sanblasianus (hypothetical)
- Pinyon jay, Gymnorhinus cyanocephalus (R)
- Steller's jay, Cyanocitta stelleri
- Blue jay, Cyanocitta cristata
- Florida scrub-jay, Aphelocoma coerulescens (accidental)
- California scrub-jay, Aphelocoma californica (accidental)
- Woodhouse's scrub-jay, Aphelocoma woodhouseii
- Mexican jay, Aphelocoma wollweberi
- Clark's nutcracker, Nucifraga columbiana (R)
- Black-billed magpie, Pica hudsonia (R)
- American crow, Corvus brachyrhynchos
- Tamaulipas crow, Corvus imparatus (R)
- Fish crow, Corvus ossifragus
- Chihuahuan raven, Corvus cryptoleucus
- Common raven, Corvus corax

== Penduline-tits ==
Order: Passeriformes Family: Remizidae

The only member of this family in the New World, the verdin is one of the smallest passerines in North America. Verdins are insectivores, and are usually solitary except when they pair up to construct their conspicuous nests.

- Verdin, Auriparus flaviceps

== Tits, chickadees, and titmice ==
Order: Passeriformes Family: Paridae

The Paridae are mainly small stocky woodland species with short stout bills. Some have crests. They are adaptable birds, with a mixed diet including seeds and insects.

- Carolina chickadee, Poecile carolinensis
- Black-capped chickadee, Poecile atricapilla (R)
- Boreal chickadee, Poecile hudsonicus (accidental)
- Mountain chickadee, Poecile gambeli
- Bridled titmouse, Baeolophus wollweberi (hypothetical)
- Juniper titmouse, Baeolophus ridgwayi
- Tufted titmouse, Baeolophus bicolor
- Black-crested titmouse, Baeolophus atricristatus

== Larks ==
Order: Passeriformes Family: Alaudidae

Larks are small terrestrial birds with often extravagant songs and display flights. Most larks are fairly dull in appearance. Their food is insects and seeds.

- Horned lark, Eremophila alpestris

== Swallows ==
Order: Passeriformes Family: Hirundinidae

The family Hirundinidae is adapted to aerial feeding. They have a slender streamlined body, long pointed wings, and a short bill with a wide gape. The feet are adapted to perching rather than walking, and the front toes are partially joined at the base.

- Blue-and-white swallow, Pygochelidon cyanoleuca (R)
- Bank swallow, Riparia riparia
- Tree swallow, Tachycineta bicolor
- Violet-green swallow, Tachycineta thalassina
- Mangrove swallow, Tachycineta albilinea (hypothetical)
- Northern rough-winged swallow, Stelgidopteryx serripennis
- Southern rough-winged swallow, Stelgidopteryx ruficollis (accidental)
- Purple martin, Progne subis
- Gray-breasted martin, Progne chalybea (R)
- Barn swallow, Hirundo rustica
- Cliff swallow, Petrochelidon pyrrhonota
- Cave swallow, Petrochelidon fulva

== Long-tailed tits ==
Order: Passeriformes Family: Aegithalidae

The long-tailed tits are a family of small passerine birds with medium to long tails. They make woven bag nests in trees. Most eat a mixed diet which includes insects.

- Bushtit, Psaltriparus minimus

== Bulbuls ==
Order: Passeriformes Family: Pycnonotidae

The bulbuls are a family of medium-sized songbirds native to Africa and tropical Asia. They are noisy and gregarious and often have beautiful songs.

- Red-vented bulbul, Pycnonotus cafer (I)

== Kinglets ==
Order: Passeriformes Family: Regulidae

The kinglets and "crests" are a small family of birds which resemble some warblers. They are very small insectivorous birds. The adults have colored crowns, giving rise to their name.

- Ruby-crowned kinglet, Corthylio calendula
- Golden-crowned kinglet, Regulus satrapa

== Waxwings ==
Order: Passeriformes Family: Bombycillidae

The waxwings are a group of passerine birds with soft silky plumage and unique red tips to some of the wing feathers. In the Bohemian and cedar waxwings, these tips look like sealing wax and give the group its name. These are arboreal birds of northern forests. They live on insects in summer and berries in winter.

- Bohemian waxwing, Bombycilla garrulus (R)
- Cedar waxwing, Bombycilla cedrorum

== Silky-flycatchers ==
Order: Passeriformes Family: Ptiliogonatidae

The silky-flycatchers are a small family of passerine birds which occur mainly in Central America. They are related to waxwings and most species have small crests.

- Gray silky-flycatcher, Ptiliogonys cinereus (R)
- Phainopepla, Phainopepla nitens

== Nuthatches ==
Order: Passeriformes Family: Sittidae

Nuthatches are small woodland birds. They have the unusual ability to climb down trees head first, unlike other birds which can only go upwards. Nuthatches have big heads, short tails, and powerful bills and feet.

- Red-breasted nuthatch, Sitta canadensis
- White-breasted nuthatch, Sitta carolinensis
- Pygmy nuthatch, Sitta pygmaea
- Brown-headed nuthatch, Sitta pusilla

== Treecreepers ==
Order: Passeriformes Family: Certhiidae

Treecreepers are small woodland birds, brown above and white below. They have thin pointed down-curved bills, which they use to extricate insects from bark. They have stiff tail feathers, like woodpeckers, which they use to support themselves on vertical trees.

- Brown creeper, Certhia americana

== Gnatcatchers ==
Order: Passeriformes Family: Polioptilidae

These dainty birds resemble Old World warblers in their structure and habits, moving restlessly through the foliage seeking insects. The gnatcatchers are mainly soft bluish gray in color and have the typical insectivore's long sharp bill. Many species have distinctive black head patterns (especially males) and long, regularly cocked, black-and-white tails.

- Blue-gray gnatcatcher, Polioptila caerulea
- Black-tailed gnatcatcher, Polioptila melanura

== Wrens ==
Order: Passeriformes Family: Troglodytidae

Wrens are small and inconspicuous birds, except for their loud songs. They have short wings and thin down-turned bills. Several species often hold their tails upright. All are insectivorous.

- Rock wren, Salpinctes obsoletus
- Canyon wren, Catherpes mexicanus
- House wren, Troglodytes aedon
- Winter wren, Troglodytes hiemalis
- Sedge wren, Cistothorus platensis
- Marsh wren, Cistothorus palustris
- Carolina wren, Thryothorus ludovicianus
- Bewick's wren, Thryomanes bewickii
- Cactus wren, Campylorhynchus brunneicapillus

== Mockingbirds and thrashers ==
Order: Passeriformes Family: Mimidae

The mimids are a family of passerine birds which includes thrashers, mockingbirds, tremblers, and the New World catbirds. These birds are notable for their vocalization, especially their remarkable ability to mimic a wide variety of birds and other sounds heard outdoors. The species tend towards dull grays and browns in their appearance.

- Blue mockingbird, Melanotis caerulescens (R)
- Black catbird, Melanoptila glabrirostris (R)
- Gray catbird, Dumetella carolinensis
- Curve-billed thrasher, Toxostoma curvirostre
- Brown thrasher, Toxostoma rufum
- Long-billed thrasher, Toxostoma longirostre
- Bendire's thrasher, Toxostoma bendirei (hypothetical)
- Crissal thrasher, Toxostoma crissale
- Sage thrasher, Oreoscoptes montanus
- Tropical mockingbird, Mimus gilvus (hypothetical)
- Northern mockingbird, Mimus polyglottos

== Starlings ==
Order: Passeriformes Family: Sturnidae

Starlings and mynas are small to medium-sized Old World passerine birds with strong feet. Their flight is strong and direct and most are very gregarious. Their preferred habitat is fairly open country, and they eat insects and fruit. The plumage of several species is dark with a metallic sheen.

- European starling, Sturnus vulgaris (I)

== Dippers ==
Order: Passeriformes Family: Cinclidae

Dippers are a group of perching birds whose habitat includes aquatic environments in the Americas, Europe, and Asia. These birds have adaptations which allows them to submerge and walk on the bottom to feed on insect larvae.

- American dipper, Cinclus mexicanus (R)

== Thrushes and allies ==
Order: Passeriformes Family: Turdidae

The thrushes are a group of passerine birds that occur mainly but not exclusively in the Old World. They are plump, soft plumaged, small to medium-sized insectivores or sometimes omnivores, often feeding on the ground. Many have attractive songs.

- Eastern bluebird, Sialia sialis
- Western bluebird, Sialia mexicana
- Mountain bluebird, Sialia currucoides
- Townsend's solitaire, Myadestes townsendi
- Orange-billed nightingale-thrush, Catharus aurantiirostris (R)
- Black-headed nightingale-thrush, Catharus mexicanus (R)
- Veery, Catharus fuscescens
- Gray-cheeked thrush, Catharus minimus
- Swainson's thrush, Catharus ustulatus
- Hermit thrush, Catharus guttatus
- Wood thrush, Hylocichla mustelina
- Clay-colored thrush, Turdus grayi
- White-throated thrush, Turdus assimilis (R)
- Rufous-backed robin, Turdus rufopalliatus (R)
- American robin, Turdus migratorius
- Varied thrush, Ixoreus naevius (R)
- Aztec thrush, Ridgwayia pinicola (R)

== Old World flycatchers ==
Order: Passeriformes Family: Muscicapidae

The Old World flycatchers form a large family of small passerine birds. These are mainly small arboreal insectivores, many of which, as the name implies, take their prey on the wing.

- Northern wheatear, Oenanthe oenanthe (R)

== Olive warbler ==
Order: Passeriformes Family: Peucedramidae

The olive warbler has a gray body with some olive-green on the wings and two white wing bars. The male's head and breast are orange and there is a black patch through the eye. This is the only species in its family.

- Olive warbler, Peucedramus taeniatus (R)

== Waxbills and allies ==
Order: Passeriformes Family: Estrildidae

The estrildid finches are small passerine birds native to the Old World tropics. They are gregarious and often colonial seed eaters with short thick but pointed bills. They are all similar in structure and habits, but have wide variation in plumage colors and patterns.

- Scaly-breasted munia, Lonchura punctulata (I)

== Old World sparrows ==
Order: Passeriformes Family: Passeridae

Old World sparrows are small passerine birds. In general, sparrows tend to be small plump brownish or grayish birds with short tails and short powerful beaks. Sparrows are seed eaters, but they also consume small insects.

- House sparrow, Passer domesticus (I)
- Eurasian tree sparrow, Passer montanus (hypothetical)

== Wagtails and pipits ==
Order: Passeriformes Family: Motacillidae

Motacillidae is a family of small passerine birds with medium to long tails. They include the wagtails, longclaws, and pipits. They are slender ground-feeding insectivores of open country.

- Eastern yellow wagtail, Motacilla tschutschensis (hypothetical)
- White wagtail, Motacilla alba (R)
- American pipit, Anthus rubescens
- Sprague's pipit, Anthus spragueii

== Finches, euphonias, and allies ==
Order: Passeriformes Family: Fringillidae

Finches are seed-eating passerine birds that are small to moderately large and have a strong beak, usually conical and in some species very large. All have twelve tail feathers and nine primaries. These birds have a bouncing flight with alternating bouts of flapping and gliding on closed wings, and most sing well.

- Evening grosbeak, Coccothraustes vespertinus (R)
- Pine grosbeak, Pinicola enucleator (R)
- Gray-crowned rosy-finch, Leucosticte tephrocotis (R)
- House finch, Haemorhous mexicanus
- Purple finch, Haemorhous purpureus
- Cassin's finch, Haemorhous cassinii
- Common redpoll, Acanthis flammea (R)
- Red crossbill, Loxia curvirostra
- White-winged crossbill, Loxia leucoptera (R)
- Pine siskin, Spinus pinus
- Black-headed siskin, Spinus notatus (hypothetical)
- Lesser goldfinch, Spinus psaltria
- Lawrence's goldfinch, Spinus lawrencei (R)
- American goldfinch, Spinus tristis

== Longspurs and snow buntings ==
Order: Passeriformes Family: Calcariidae

The Calcariidae are a group of passerine birds that had been traditionally grouped with the New World sparrows, but differ in a number of respects and are usually found in open grassy areas.

- Lapland longspur, Calcarius lapponicus
- Chestnut-collared longspur, Calcarius ornatus
- Smith's longspur, Calcarius pictus
- Thick-billed longspur, Rhyncophanes mccownii
- Snow bunting, Plectrophenax nivalis (R)

== New World sparrows ==
Order: Passeriformes Family: Passerellidae

Until 2017, these species were considered part of the family Emberizidae. Most of the species are known as sparrows, but these birds are not closely related to the Old World sparrows which are in the family Passeridae. Many of these have distinctive head patterns.

- Rufous-winged sparrow, Peucaea carpalis (hypothetical)
- Botteri's sparrow, Peucaea botterii
- Cassin's sparrow, Peucaea cassinii
- Bachman's sparrow, Peucaea aestivalis
- Grasshopper sparrow, Ammodramus savannarum
- Five-striped sparrow, Amphispizopsis quinquestriata (hypothetical)
- Olive sparrow, Arremonops rufivirgatus
- Black-throated sparrow, Amphispiza bilineata
- Lark sparrow, Chondestes grammacus
- Lark bunting, Calamospiza melanocorys
- Chipping sparrow, Spizella passerina
- Clay-colored sparrow, Spizella pallida
- Black-chinned sparrow, Spizella atrogularis
- Field sparrow, Spizella pusilla
- Brewer's sparrow, Spizella breweri
- Worthen's sparrow, Spizella wortheni (hypothetical)
- Fox sparrow, Passerella iliaca
- American tree sparrow, Spizelloides arborea
- Dark-eyed junco, Junco hyemalis
- Yellow-eyed junco, Junco phaeonotus (R)
- White-crowned sparrow, Zonotrichia leucophrys
- Golden-crowned sparrow, Zonotrichia atricapilla (R)
- Harris's sparrow, Zonotrichia querula
- White-throated sparrow, Zonotrichia albicollis
- Sagebrush sparrow, Artemisiospiza nevadensis
- Bell's sparrow, Artemisiospiza belli (hypothetical)
- Vesper sparrow, Pooecetes gramineus
- LeConte's sparrow, Ammospiza leconteii
- Seaside sparrow, Ammospiza maritima
- Nelson's sparrow, Ammospiza nelsoni
- Baird's sparrow, Centronyx bairdii
- Henslow's sparrow, Centronyx henslowii
- Savannah sparrow, Passerculus sandwichensis
- Song sparrow, Melospiza melodia
- Lincoln's sparrow, Melospiza lincolnii
- Swamp sparrow, Melospiza georgiana
- Canyon towhee, Melozone fuscus
- Abert's towhee, Melozone aberti (hypothetical)
- Rufous-crowned sparrow, Aimophila ruficeps
- Green-tailed towhee, Pipilo chlorurus
- Spotted towhee, Pipilo maculatus
- Eastern towhee, Pipilo erythrophthalmus

== Spindalises ==
Order: Passeriformes Family: Spindalidae

The members of this small family, newly recognized in 2017, are native to the Greater Antilles.

- Western spindalis, Spindalis zena (hypothetical)

== Yellow-breasted chat ==
Order: Passeriformes Family: Icteriidae

This species was historically placed in the wood-warblers (Parulidae) but nonetheless most authorities were unsure if it belonged there. It was placed in its own family in 2017.

- Yellow-breasted chat, Icteria virens

== Troupials and allies ==
Order: Passeriformes Family: Icteridae

The icterids are a group of small to medium-sized, often colorful passerine birds restricted to the New World and include the grackles, New World blackbirds, and New World orioles. Most species have black as a predominant plumage color which is often enlivened by yellow, orange, or red.

- Yellow-headed blackbird, Xanthocephalus xanthocephalus
- Bobolink, Dolichonyx oryzivorus
- Chihuahuan meadowlark, Sturnella lilianae
- Eastern meadowlark, Sturnella magna
- Western meadowlark, Sturnella neglecta
- Black-vented oriole, Icterus wagleri (R)
- Orchard oriole, Icterus spurius
- Hooded oriole, Icterus cucullatus
- Streak-backed oriole, Icterus pustulatus (R)
- Bullock's oriole, Icterus bullockii
- Altamira oriole, Icterus gularis
- Audubon's oriole, Icterus graduacauda
- Baltimore oriole, Icterus galbula
- Scott's oriole, Icterus parisorum
- Red-winged blackbird, Agelaius phoeniceus
- Shiny cowbird, Molothrus bonariensis (R)
- Bronzed cowbird, Molothrus aeneus
- Brown-headed cowbird, Molothrus ater
- Melodious blackbird, Dives dives (hypothetical)
- Rusty blackbird, Euphagus carolinus
- Brewer's blackbird, Euphagus cyanocephalus
- Common grackle, Quiscalus quiscula
- Boat-tailed grackle, Quiscalus major
- Great-tailed grackle, Quiscalus mexicanus

== New World warblers ==
Order: Passeriformes Family: Parulidae

The wood-warblers are a group of small often colorful passerine birds restricted to the New World. Most are arboreal, but some are more terrestrial. Most members of this family are insectivores.

- Ovenbird, Seiurus aurocapilla
- Worm-eating warbler, Helmitheros vermivorum
- Louisiana waterthrush, Parkesia motacilla
- Northern waterthrush, Parkesia noveboracensis
- Golden-winged warbler, Vermivora chrysoptera
- Blue-winged warbler, Vermivora cyanoptera
- Black-and-white warbler, Mniotilta varia
- Prothonotary warbler, Protonotaria citrea
- Swainson's warbler, Limnothlypis swainsonii
- Crescent-chested warbler, Oreothlypis superciliosa (R)
- Tennessee warbler, Leiothlypis peregrina
- Orange-crowned warbler, Leiothlypis celata
- Colima warbler, Leiothlypis crissalis
- Lucy's warbler, Leiothlypis luciae
- Nashville warbler, Leiothlypis ruficapilla
- Virginia's warbler, Leiothlypis virginiae
- Connecticut warbler, Oporornis agilis (R)
- Gray-crowned yellowthroat, Geothlypis poliocephala (R)
- MacGillivray's warbler, Geothlypis tolmiei
- Mourning warbler, Geothlypis philadelphia
- Kentucky warbler, Geothlypis formosa
- Common yellowthroat, Geothlypis trichas
- Hooded warbler, Setophaga citrina
- American redstart, Setophaga ruticilla
- Cape May warbler, Setophaga tigrina
- Cerulean warbler, Setophaga cerulea
- Northern parula, Setophaga americana
- Tropical parula, Setophaga pitiayumi
- Magnolia warbler, Setophaga magnolia
- Bay-breasted warbler, Setophaga castanea
- Blackburnian warbler, Setophaga fusca
- Yellow warbler, Setophaga petechia
- Chestnut-sided warbler, Setophaga pensylvanica
- Blackpoll warbler, Setophaga striata
- Black-throated blue warbler, Setophaga caerulescens
- Palm warbler, Setophaga palmarum
- Pine warbler, Setophaga pinus
- Yellow-rumped warbler, Setophaga coronata
- Yellow-throated warbler, Setophaga dominica
- Prairie warbler, Setophaga discolor
- Barbuda warbler, Setophaga subita (accidental)
- Grace's warbler, Setophaga graciae
- Black-throated gray warbler, Setophaga nigrescens
- Townsend's warbler, Setophaga townsendi
- Hermit warbler, Setophaga occidentalis
- Golden-cheeked warbler, Setophaga chrysoparia
- Black-throated green warbler, Setophaga virens
- Fan-tailed warbler, Basileuterus lachrymosus (R)
- Rufous-capped warbler, Basileuterus rufifrons (R)
- Golden-crowned warbler, Basileuterus culicivorus (R)
- Canada warbler, Cardellina canadensis
- Wilson's warbler, Cardellina pusilla
- Red-faced warbler, Cardellina rubrifrons
- Painted redstart, Myioborus pictus
- Slate-throated redstart, Myioborus miniatus (R)

== Cardinals and allies ==
Order: Passeriformes Family: Cardinalidae

The cardinals are a family of robust seed-eating birds with strong bills. They are typically associated with open woodland. The sexes usually have distinct plumages.

- Hepatic tanager, Piranga flava
- Summer tanager, Piranga rubra
- Scarlet tanager, Piranga olivacea
- Western tanager, Piranga ludoviciana
- Flame-colored tanager, Piranga bidentata (R)
- Crimson-collared grosbeak, Rhodothraupis celaeno (R)
- Northern cardinal, Cardinalis cardinalis
- Pyrrhuloxia, Cardinalis sinuatus
- Yellow grosbeak, Pheuticus chrysopeplus (R)
- Rose-breasted grosbeak, Pheucticus ludovicianus
- Black-headed grosbeak, Pheucticus melanocephalus
- Blue bunting, Cyanocompsa parellina (R)
- Blue grosbeak, Passerina caerulea
- Lazuli bunting, Passerina amoena
- Indigo bunting, Passerina cyanea
- Orange-breasted bunting, Passerina leclancherii (hypothetical)
- Varied bunting, Passerina versicolor
- Painted bunting, Passerina ciris
- Dickcissel, Spiza americana

== Tanagers and allies ==
Order: Passeriformes Family: Thraupidae

The tanagers are a large group of small to medium-sized passerine birds restricted to the New World, mainly in the tropics. Many species are brightly colored. As a family they are omnivorous, but individual species specialize in eating fruits, seeds, insects, or other types of food.

- Grassland yellow-finch, Sicalis luteola (hypothetical)
- Blue-black grassquit, Volatinia jacarina (hypothetical)
- Red-legged honeycreeper, Cyanerpes cyaneus (R)
- Bananaquit, Coereba flaveola (hypothetical)
- Yellow-faced grassquit, Tiaris olivaceus (R)
- Lesson's seedeater, Sporophila bouvronides (accidental)
- Cinnamon-rumped seedeater, Sporophila torqueola (hypothetical)
- Morelet's seedeater, Sporophila morelleti

== Presumptive species ==
Written descriptions of sight records of these species have been accepted by the TBRC. However, they did not meet the criteria (identifiable specimen, photo, video, or audio recording) for inclusion on the official list.

- Murre species, Uria sp.
- Razorbill, Alca torda

== See also ==
- List of birds of Big Bend National Park
- List of birds of Guadalupe Mountains National Park
