= List of birds of Big Bend National Park =

This is a comprehensive listing of all the bird species recorded in Big Bend National Park, which is in the U.S. state of Texas. Unless otherwise noted, this list is based on one published by the National Park Service (NPS) as of September 2025.

This list is presented in the taxonomic sequence of the Check-list of North and Middle American Birds, 7th edition through the 66th Supplement, published by the American Ornithological Society (AOS). Common and scientific names are also those of the Check-list, except that the common names of families are from the Clements taxonomy because the AOS list does not include them.

This list contains 409 species. Unless otherwise noted, all are considered to occur regularly in Big Bend National Park as permanent residents, summer or winter visitors, or migrants. The tags below are used to designate the abundance of some species.

- (R) Rare - "usually seen only a few times each year" per the NPS (118 species)
- (Unc) Uncommon - "likely to be seen monthly in appropriate habitat and season and may be locally common" per the NPS (86 species)
- (O) Occasional - "occur in a park at least once every few years, varying in numbers, but not necessarily every year" per the NPS (62 species)
- (I) Introduced - a species introduced to North America by the actions of man, either directly or indirectly (four species)

== Ducks, geese, and waterfowl ==
Order: Anseriformes Family: Anatidae

Anatidae includes the ducks and most duck-like waterfowl, such as geese and swans. These birds are adapted to an aquatic existence with webbed feet, bills which are flattened to a greater or lesser extent, and feathers that are excellent at shedding water due to special oils.

- Black-bellied whistling-duck, Dendrocygna autumnalis (O)
- Snow goose, Anser caerulescens (Unc)
- Ross's goose, Anser rossii (R)
- Greater white-fronted goose, Anser albifrons (O)
- Canada goose, Branta canadensis (R)
- Tundra swan, Cygnus columbianus (R)
- Wood duck, Aix sponsa (Unc)
- Blue-winged teal, Spatula discors
- Cinnamon teal, Spatula cyanoptera
- Northern shoveler, Spatula clypeata
- Gadwall, Mareca strepera
- American wigeon, Mareca americana
- Mallard, Anas platyrhynchos (Unc)
- Mexican duck, Anas diazi
- Northern pintail, Anas acuta (Unc)
- Green-winged teal, Anas crecca
- Canvasback, Aythya valisineria (O)
- Redhead, Aythya americana (R)
- Ring-necked duck, Aythya collaris
- Lesser scaup, Aythya affinis (Unc)
- Bufflehead, Bucephala albeola
- Common goldeneye, Bucephala clangula (R)
- Hooded merganser, Lophodytes cucullatus (R)
- Common merganser, Mergus merganser (R)
- Red-breasted merganser, Mergus serrator (O)
- Ruddy duck, Oxyura jamaicensis (R)

== New World quail ==
Order: Galliformes Family: Odontophoridae

The New World quails are small, plump terrestrial birds only distantly related to the quails of the Old World, but named for their similar appearance and habits.

- Scaled quail, Callipepla squamata
- Gambel's quail, Callipepla gambelii (R)
- Montezuma quail, Cyrtonyx montezumae (R)

== Pheasants, grouse, and allies ==
Order: Galliformes Family: Phasianidae

Phasianidae consists of the pheasants and their allies. These are terrestrial species, variable in size but generally plump with broad relatively short wings. Many species are gamebirds or have been domesticated as a food source for humans.

- Wild turkey, Meleagris gallopavo (R)

== Grebes ==
Order: Podicipediformes Family: Podicipedidae

Grebes are small to medium-large freshwater diving birds. They have lobed toes and are excellent swimmers and divers. However, they have their feet placed far back on the body, making them quite ungainly on land.

- Least grebe, Tachybaptus dominicus (R)
- Pied-billed grebe, Podilymbus podiceps
- Eared grebe, Podiceps nigricollis (R)

== Pigeons and doves ==
Order: Columbiformes Family: Columbidae

Pigeons and doves are stout-bodied birds with short necks and short slender bills with a fleshy cere. They feed on seeds, fruit, and plants.

- Inca dove, Columbina inca
- Common ground dove, Columbina passerina
- Ruddy ground dove, Columbina talpacoti (O)
- White-tipped dove, Leptotila verreauxi (O)
- White-winged dove, Zenaida asiatica
- Mourning dove, Zenaida macroura
- Band-tailed pigeon, Patagioenas fasciata (Unc)
- Eurasian collared-dove, Streptopelia decaocto (I)
- Rock pigeon, Columba livia (I) (R)

== Cuckoos ==
Order: Cuculiformes Family: Cuculidae

The family Cuculidae includes cuckoos, roadrunners, and anis. These birds are of variable size with slender bodies, long tails, and strong legs.

- Groove-billed ani, Crotophaga sulcirostris (R)
- Greater roadrunner, Geococcyx californianus
- Yellow-billed cuckoo, Coccyzus americanus
- Black-billed cuckoo, Coccyzus erythropthalmus (O)

== Nightjars and allies ==
Order: Caprimulgiformes Family: Caprimulgidae

Nightjars are medium-sized nocturnal birds that usually nest on the ground. They have long wings, short legs, and very short bills. Most have small feet, of little use for walking, and long pointed wings. Their soft plumage is cryptically colored to resemble bark or leaves.

- Lesser nighthawk, Chordeiles acutipennis
- Common nighthawk, Chordeiles minor (Unc)
- Common poorwill, Phalaenoptilus nuttallii
- Mexican whip-poor-will, Antrostomus arizonae (Unc)

== Swifts ==
Order: Apodiformes Family: Apodidae

The swifts are small birds which spend the majority of their lives flying. These birds have very short legs and never settle voluntarily on the ground, perching instead only on vertical surfaces. Many swifts have long swept-back wings which resemble a crescent or boomerang.

- Chimney swift, Chaetura pelagica (O)
- White-throated swift, Aeronautes saxatalis

== Hummingbirds ==
Order: Apodiformes Family: Trochilidae

Hummingbirds are small birds capable of hovering in mid-air due to the rapid flapping of their wings. They are the only birds that can fly backwards.

- Rivoli's hummingbird, Eugenes fulgens (R)
- Blue-throated mountain-gem, Lampornis clemenciae
- Lucifer hummingbird, Calothorax lucifer (Unc)
- Ruby-throated hummingbird, Archilochus colubris (R)
- Black-chinned hummingbird, Archilochus alexandri
- Anna's hummingbird, Calypte anna
- Costa's hummingbird, Calypte costae (R)
- Calliope hummingbird, Selasphorus calliope (R)
- Rufous hummingbird, Selasphorus rufus
- Broad-tailed hummingbird, Selasphorus platycercus
- Broad-billed hummingbird, Cynanthus latirostris (R)
- White-eared hummingbird, Basilinna leucotis (R)
- Violet-crowned hummingbird, Leucolia violiceps (O)
- Berylline hummingbird, Saucerottia beryllina (O)

== Cranes ==
Order: Gruiformes Family: Gruidae

Cranes are large, long-legged, and long-necked birds. Unlike the similar-looking but unrelated herons, cranes fly with necks outstretched, not pulled back. Most have elaborate and noisy courting displays or "dances".

- Sandhill crane, Antigone canadensis (Unc)

== Rails, gallinules, and coots ==
Order: Gruiformes Family: Rallidae

Rallidae is a large family of small to medium-sized birds which includes the rails, crakes, coots, and gallinules. The most typical family members occupy dense vegetation in damp environments near lakes, swamps, or rivers. In general they are shy and secretive birds, making them difficult to observe. Most species have strong legs and long toes which are well adapted to soft uneven surfaces. They tend to have short, rounded wings and to be weak fliers.

- King rail, Rallus elegans (O)
- Virginia rail, Rallus limicola (Unc)
- Sora, Porzana carolina
- Common gallinule, Gallinula galeata (R)
- American coot, Fulica americana
- Purple gallinule, Porphyrio martinicus (O)
- Yellow rail, Coturnicops noveboracensis (O)

== Stilts and avocets ==
Order: Charadriiformes Family: Recurvirostridae

Recurvirostridae is a family of large wading birds which includes the avocets and stilts. The avocets have long legs and long up-curved bills. The stilts have extremely long legs and long, thin, straight bills.

- Black-necked stilt, Himantopus mexicanus (Unc)
- American avocet, Recurvirostra americana (Unc)

== Plovers and lapwings ==
Order: Charadriiformes Family: Charadriidae

The family Charadriidae includes the plovers, dotterels, and lapwings. They are small to medium-sized birds with compact bodies, short thick necks, and long, usually pointed, wings. They are found in open country worldwide, mostly in habitats near water.

- Killdeer, Charadrius vociferus

== Sandpipers and allies ==
Order: Charadriiformes Family: Scolopacidae

Scolopacidae is a large diverse family of small to medium-sized shorebirds including the sandpipers, curlews, godwits, shanks, tattlers, woodcocks, snipes, dowitchers, and phalaropes. The majority of these species eat small invertebrates picked out of the mud or soil. Different lengths of legs and bills enable multiple species to feed in the same habitat, particularly on the coast, without direct competition for food.

- Upland sandpiper, Bartramia longicauda (R)
- Whimbrel, Numenius phaeopus (R)
- Long-billed curlew, Numenius americanus (R)
- Dunlin, Calidris alpina (O)
- Baird's sandpiper, Calidris bairdii (Unc)
- Least sandpiper, Calidris minutilla (Unc)
- Pectoral sandpiper, Calidris melanotos (R)
- Western sandpiper, Calidris mauri (Unc)
- Long-billed dowitcher, Limnodromus scolopaceus (R)
- American woodcock, Scolopax minor (O)
- Wilson's snipe, Gallinago delicata (Unc)
- Spotted sandpiper, Actitis macularia
- Solitary sandpiper, Tringa solitaria (Unc)
- Lesser yellowlegs, Tringa flavipes (R)
- Willet, Tringa semipalmata (R)
- Greater yellowlegs, Tringa melanoleuca (Unc)
- Wilson's phalarope, Phalaropus tricolor (R)

== Gulls, terns, and skimmers ==
Order: Charadriiformes Family: Laridae

Laridae is a family of medium to large seabirds and includes gulls, terns, and skimmers. Gulls are typically gray or white, often with black markings on the head or wings. They have stout, longish bills and webbed feet. Terns are a group of generally medium to large seabirds typically with grey or white plumage, often with black markings on the head. Most terns hunt fish by diving but some pick insects off the surface of fresh water. Terns are generally long-lived birds, with several species known to live in excess of 30 years. Skimmers are a small family of tropical tern-like birds. They have an elongated lower mandible which they use to feed by flying low over the water surface and skimming the water for small fish.

- Black-legged kittiwake, Rissa tridactyla (O)
- Bonaparte's gull, Chroicocephalus philadelphia (R)
- Laughing gull, Leucophaeus atricilla (R)
- Franklin's gull, Leucophaeus pipixcan (R)
- Ring-billed gull, Larus delawarensis (Unc)
- Least tern, Sternula antillarum (R)
- Black tern, Chlidonias niger (O)
- Forster's tern, Sterna forsteri (R)

== Loons ==
Order: Gaviiformes Family: Gaviidae

Loons are aquatic birds, the size of a large duck, to which they are unrelated. Their plumage is largely gray or black, and they have spear-shaped bills. Loons swim well and fly adequately, but are almost hopeless on land, because their legs are placed towards the rear of the body.

- Common loon, Gavia immer (O)

== Anhingas ==
Order: Suliformes Family: Anhingidae

Anhingas are cormorant-like water birds with very long necks and long straight beaks. They are fish eaters which often swim with only their neck above the water.

- Anhinga, Anhinga anhinga (O)

== Cormorants and shags ==
Order: Suliformes Family: Phalacrocoracidae

Cormorants are medium-to-large aquatic birds, usually with mainly dark plumage and areas of colored skin on the face. The bill is long, thin, and sharply hooked. Their feet are four-toed and webbed.

- Double-crested cormorant, Nannopterum auritum (R)
- Neotropic cormorant, Nannopterum brasilianum (R)

== Ibises and spoonbills ==
Order: Pelecaniformes Family: Threskiornithidae

The family Threskiornithidae includes the ibises and spoonbills. They have long, broad wings. Their bodies tend to be elongated, the neck more so, with rather long legs. The bill is also long, decurved in the case of the ibises, straight and distinctively flattened in the spoonbills.

- White ibis, Eudocimus albus (R)
- White-faced ibis, Plegadis chihi
- Roseate spoonbill, Ajaia ajaja (O)

== Pelicans ==
Order: Pelecaniformes Family: Pelecanidae

Pelicans are very large water birds with a distinctive pouch under their beak. Like other birds in the order Pelecaniformes, they have four webbed toes.

- American white pelican, Pelecanus erythrorhynchos (R)
- Brown pelican, Pelecanus occidentalis (R)

== Herons, egrets, and bitterns ==
Order: Pelecaniformes Family: Ardeidae

The family Ardeidae contains the herons, egrets, and bitterns. Herons and egrets are medium to large wading birds with long necks and legs. Bitterns tend to be shorter necked and more secretive. Members of Ardeidae fly with their necks retracted, unlike other long-necked birds such as storks, ibises, and spoonbills.

- American bittern, Botaurus lentiginosus (Unc)
- Least bittern, Ixobrychus exilis (R)
- Great blue heron, Ardea herodias
- Great egret, Ardea alba (Unc)
- Snowy egret, Egretta thula (Unc)
- Little blue heron, Egretta caerulea (R)
- Tricolored heron, Egretta tricolor (R)
- Reddish egret, Egretta rufescens (O)
- Cattle egret, Bubulcus ibis
- Green heron, Butorides virescens
- Black-crowned night-heron, Nycticorax nycticorax (Unc)
- Yellow-crowned night-heron, Nyctanassa violacea (R)

== New World vultures ==
Order: Cathartiformes Family: Cathartidae

The New World vultures are not closely related to Old World vultures, but superficially resemble them because of convergent evolution. Like the Old World vultures, they are scavengers. However, unlike Old World vultures, which find carcasses by sight, New World vultures have a good sense of smell with which they locate carcasses.

- Black vulture, Coragyps atratus
- Turkey vulture, Cathartes aura

== Osprey ==
Order: Accipitriformes Family: Pandionidae

Pandionidae is a monotypic family of fish-eating birds of prey. Its single species possesses a very large and powerful hooked beak, strong legs, strong talons, and keen eyesight.

- Osprey, Pandion haliaetus (Unc)

== Hawks, eagles, and kites ==
Order: Accipitriformes Family: Accipitridae

Accipitridae is a family of birds of prey which includes hawks, eagles, kites, harriers, and Old World vultures. These birds have very large powerful hooked beaks for tearing flesh from their prey, strong legs, powerful talons, and keen eyesight.

- White-tailed kite, Elanus leucurus (O)
- Swallow-tailed kite, Elanoides forficatus (O)
- Golden eagle, Aquila chrysaetos (R)
- Sharp-shinned hawk, Accipiter striatus (Unc)
- Cooper's hawk, Astur cooperii
- American goshawk, Astur atricapillus (O)
- Northern harrier, Circus hudsonius (Unc)
- Bald eagle, Haliaeetus leucocephalus (O)
- Mississippi kite, Ictinia mississippiensis (Unc)
- Common black hawk, Buteogallus anthracinus (R)
- Harris's hawk, Parabuteo unicinctus (Unc)
- White-tailed hawk, Geranoaetus albicaudatus (O)
- Gray hawk, Buteo plagiatus (Unc)
- Red-shouldered hawk, Buteo lineatus (R)
- Broad-winged hawk, Buteo platypterus (R)
- Short-tailed hawk, Buteo brachyurus (O)
- Swainson's hawk, Buteo swainsoni (Unc)
- Zone-tailed hawk, Buteo albonotatus
- Red-tailed hawk, Buteo jamaicensis
- Rough-legged hawk, Buteo lagopus (R)
- Ferruginous hawk, Buteo regalis (Unc)

== Barn-owls ==
Order: Strigiformes Family: Tytonidae

Owls in the family Tytonidae are medium to large owls with large heads and characteristic heart-shaped faces.

- Barn owl, Tyto alba (R)

== Owls ==
Order: Strigiformes Family: Strigidae

Typical or "true" owls are small to large solitary nocturnal birds of prey. They have large forward-facing eyes and ears, a hawk-like beak, and a conspicuous circle of feathers around each eye called a facial disk.

- Flammulated owl, Psiloscops flammeolus (R)
- Western screech-owl, Megascops kennicottii (Unc)
- Eastern screech-owl, Megascops asio (R)
- Great horned owl, Bubo virginianus
- Northern pygmy-owl, Glaucidium gnoma (R)
- Ferruginous pygmy-owl, Glaucidium brasilianum (O)
- Elf owl, Micrathene whitneyi
- Burrowing owl, Athene cunicularia (Unc)
- Long-eared owl, Asio otus (R)
- Short-eared owl, Asio flammeus (R)
- Northern saw-whet owl, Aegolius acadicus (O)

== Trogons ==
Order: Trogoniformes Family: Trogonidae

Trogons are residents of tropical forests worldwide with the greatest diversity in Central and South America. They feed on insects and fruit, and their broad bills and weak legs reflect their diet and arboreal habits.

- Elegant trogon, Trogon elegans (O)

== Kingfishers ==
Order: Coraciiformes Family: Alcedinidae

Kingfishers are medium-sized birds with large heads, long, pointed bills, short legs, and stubby tails.

- Belted kingfisher, Megaceryle alcyon (Unc)
- Green kingfisher, Chloroceryle americana (R)

== Woodpeckers ==
Order: Piciformes Family: Picidae

Woodpeckers are small to medium-sized birds with chisel-like beaks, short legs, stiff tails, and long tongues used for capturing insects. Some species have feet with two toes pointing forward and two backward, while several species have only three toes. Many woodpeckers have the habit of tapping noisily on tree trunks with their beaks.

- Lewis's woodpecker, Melanerpes lewis (R)
- Red-headed woodpecker, Melanerpes erythrocephalus (R)
- Acorn woodpecker, Melanerpes formicivorus
- Golden-fronted woodpecker, Melanerpes aurifrons
- Williamson's sapsucker, Sphyrapicus thyroideus (R)
- Yellow-bellied sapsucker, Sphyrapicus varius (Unc)
- Red-naped sapsucker, Sphyrapicus nuchalis
- Ladder-backed woodpecker, Dryobates scalaris
- Northern flicker, Colaptes auratus

== Falcons and caracaras ==
Order: Falconiformes Family: Falconidae

Falconidae is a family of diurnal birds of prey, notably the falcons and caracaras. They differ from hawks, eagles, and kites in that they kill with their beaks instead of their talons.

- Crested caracara, Caracara plancus (R)
- American kestrel, Falco sparverius
- Merlin, Falco columbarius (Unc)
- Aplomado falcon, Falco femoralis (O)
- Peregrine falcon, Falco peregrinus
- Prairie falcon, Falco mexicanus (R)

== Tityras and allies ==
Order: Passeriformes Family: Tityridae

Tityridae is family of suboscine passerine birds found in forest and woodland in the Neotropics. The approximately 30 species in this family were formerly lumped with the families Pipridae and Cotingidae. They are small to medium-sized birds.

- Rose-throated becard, Pachyramphus aglaiae (O)

== Tyrant flycatchers ==
Order: Passeriformes Family: Tyrannidae

Tyrant flycatchers are Passerine birds which occur throughout North and South America. They superficially resemble the Old World flycatchers, but are more robust and have stronger bills. They do not have the sophisticated vocal capabilities of the songbirds. Most, but not all, are rather plain. As the name implies, most are insectivorous.

- Dusky-capped flycatcher, Myiarchus tuberculifer (R)
- Ash-throated flycatcher, Myiarchus cinerascens
- Great crested flycatcher, Myiarchus crinitus (R)
- Brown-crested flycatcher, Myiarchus tyrannulus (Unc)
- Great kiskadee, Pitangus sulphuratus (O)
- Sulphur-bellied flycatcher, Myiodynastes luteiventris (O)
- Piratic flycatcher, Legatus leucophaius (O)
- Tropical kingbird, Tyrannus melancholicus (Unc)
- Couch's kingbird, Tyrannus couchii (R)
- Cassin's kingbird, Tyrannus vociferans
- Thick-billed kingbird, Tyrannus crassirostris (O)
- Western kingbird, Tyrannus verticalis
- Eastern kingbird, Tyrannus tyrannus (R)
- Scissor-tailed flycatcher, Tyrannus forficatus (Unc)
- Tufted flycatcher, Mitrephanes phaeocercus (O)
- Olive-sided flycatcher, Contopus cooperi (Unc)
- Greater pewee, Contopus pertinax (O)
- Western wood-pewee, Contopus sordidulus
- Eastern wood-pewee, Contopus virens (R)
- Yellow-bellied flycatcher, Empidonax flaviventris (O)
- Willow flycatcher, Empidonax traillii (Unc)
- Least flycatcher, Empidonax minimus
- Hammond's flycatcher, Empidonax hammondii (Unc)
- Gray flycatcher, Empidonax wrightii
- Dusky flycatcher, Empidonax oberholseri
- Western flycatcher, Empidonax difficilis
- Black phoebe, Sayornis nigricans
- Eastern phoebe, Sayornis phoebe
- Say's phoebe, Sayornis saya
- Vermilion flycatcher, Pyrocephalus rubinus

== Vireos, shrike-babblers, and erpornis ==
Order: Passeriformes Family: Vireonidae

The vireos are a group of small to medium-sized passerine birds restricted to the New World, though a few other species in the family are found in Asia. They are typically greenish in color and resemble wood-warblers apart from their heavier bills.

- Black-capped vireo, Vireo atricapilla (Unc)
- White-eyed vireo, Vireo griseus (R)
- Bell's vireo, Vireo bellii
- Gray vireo, Vireo vicinior
- Hutton's vireo, Vireo huttoni
- Yellow-throated vireo, Vireo flavifrons (Unc)
- Cassin's vireo, Vireo cassinii (Unc)
- Blue-headed vireo, Vireo solitarius (Unc)
- Plumbeous vireo, Vireo plumbeus
- Philadelphia vireo, Vireo philadelphicus (R)
- Warbling vireo, Vireo gilvus
- Red-eyed vireo, Vireo olivaceus
- Yellow-green vireo, Vireo flavoviridis (R)

== Shrikes ==
Order: Passeriformes Family: Laniidae

Shrikes are passerine birds known for their habit of catching other birds and small animals and impaling the uneaten portions of their bodies on thorns. A shrike's beak is hooked, like that of a typical bird of prey.

- Loggerhead shrike, Lanius ludovicianus

== Crows, jays, and magpies ==
Order: Passeriformes Family: Corvidae

The family Corvidae includes crows, ravens, jays, choughs, magpies, treepies, nutcrackers, and ground jays. Corvids are above average in size among the Passeriformes, and some of the larger species show high levels of intelligence.

- Pinyon jay, Gymnorhinus cyanocephalus (O)
- Steller's jay, Cyanocitta stelleri (O)
- Blue jay, Cyanocitta cristata (R)
- Woodhouse's scrub-jay, Aphelocoma woodhouseii (Unc)
- Mexican jay, Aphelocoma wollweberi
- Clark's nutcracker, Nucifraga columbiana (O)
- Chihuahuan raven, Corvus cryptoleucus (Unc)
- Common raven, Corvus corax

== Penduline-tits ==
Order: Passeriformes Family: Remizidae

The only member of this family in the New World, the verdin is one of the smallest passerines in North America. Verdins are insectivores, and are usually solitary except when they pair up to construct their conspicuous nests.

- Verdin, Auriparus flaviceps

== Tits, chickadees, and titmice ==
Order: Passeriformes Family: Paridae

The Paridae are mainly small stocky woodland species with short stout bills. Some have crests. They are adaptable birds, with a mixed diet including seeds and insects.

- Mountain chickadee, Poecile gambeli (O)
- Black-crested titmouse, Baeolophus atricristatus

== Larks ==
Order: Passeriformes Family: Alaudidae

Larks are small terrestrial birds with often extravagant songs and display flights. Most larks are fairly dull in appearance. Their food is insects and seeds.

- Horned lark, Eremophila alpestris (R)

== Swallows ==
Order: Passeriformes Family: Hirundinidae

The family Hirundinidae is adapted to aerial feeding. They have a slender streamlined body, long pointed wings, and a short bill with a wide gape. The feet are adapted to perching rather than walking, and the front toes are partially joined at the base.

- Bank swallow, Riparia riparia (Unc)
- Tree swallow, Tachycineta bicolor (Unc)
- Violet-green swallow, Tachycineta thalassina
- Northern rough-winged swallow, Stelgidopteryx serripennis
- Purple martin, Progne subis (R)
- Barn swallow, Hirundo rustica
- Cliff swallow, Petrochelidon pyrrhonota
- Cave swallow, Petrochelidon fulva (Unc)

== Long-tailed tits ==
Order: Passeriformes Family: Aegithalidae

The long-tailed tits are a family of small passerine birds with medium to long tails. They make woven bag nests in trees. Most eat a mixed diet which includes insects.

- Bushtit, Psaltriparus minimus

== Kinglets ==
Order: Passeriformes Family: Regulidae

The kinglets and "crests" are a small family of birds which resemble some warblers. They are very small insectivorous birds in the single genus Regulus. The adults have colored crowns, giving rise to their name.

- Ruby-crowned kinglet, Corthylio calendula
- Golden-crowned kinglet, Regulus satrapa (R)

== Waxwings ==
Order: Passeriformes Family: Bombycillidae

The waxwings are a group of passerine birds with soft silky plumage and unique red tips to some of the wing feathers. In the Bohemian and cedar waxwings, these tips look like sealing wax and give the group its name. These are arboreal birds of northern forests. They live on insects in summer and berries in winter.

- Cedar waxwing, Bombycilla cedrorum (Unc)

== Silky-flycatchers ==
Order: Passeriformes Family: Ptiliogonatidae

The silky-flycatchers are a small family of passerine birds which occur mainly in Central America. They are related to waxwings and most species have small crests.

- Phainopepla, Phainopepla nitens (Unc)

== Nuthatches ==
Order: Passeriformes Family: Sittidae

Nuthatches are small woodland birds. They have the unusual ability to climb down trees head first, unlike other birds which can only go upwards. Nuthatches have big heads, short tails, and powerful bills and feet.

- Red-breasted nuthatch, Sitta canadensis (R)
- White-breasted nuthatch, Sitta carolinensis (Unc)
- Pygmy nuthatch, Sitta pygmaea (O)

== Treecreepers ==
Order: Passeriformes Family: Certhiidae

Treecreepers are small woodland birds, brown above and white below. They have thin pointed down-curved bills, which they use to extricate insects from bark. They have stiff tail feathers, like woodpeckers, which they use to support themselves on vertical trees.

- Brown creeper, Certhia americana (Unc)

== Gnatcatchers ==
Order: Passeriformes Family: Polioptilidae

These dainty birds resemble Old World warblers in their structure and habits, moving restlessly through the foliage seeking insects. The gnatcatchers are mainly soft bluish gray in color and have the typical insectivore's long sharp bill. Many species have distinctive black head patterns (especially males) and long, regularly cocked, black-and-white tails.

- Blue-gray gnatcatcher, Polioptila caerulea
- Black-tailed gnatcatcher, Polioptila melanura

== Wrens ==
Order: Passeriformes Family: Troglodytidae

Wrens are small and inconspicuous birds, except for their loud songs. They have short wings and thin down-turned bills. Several species often hold their tails upright. All are insectivorous.

- Rock wren, Salpinctes obsoletus
- Canyon wren, Catherpes mexicanus
- Cactus wren, Campylorhynchus brunneicapillus
- Bewick's wren, Thryomanes bewickii
- Carolina wren, Thryothorus ludovicianus (Unc)
- Northern house wren, Troglodytes aedon
- Winter wren, Troglodytes hiemalis (R)
- Sedge wren, Cistothorus platensis (O)
- Marsh wren, Cistothorus palustris

== Mockingbirds and thrashers ==
Order: Passeriformes Family: Mimidae

The mimids are a family of passerine birds which includes thrashers, mockingbirds, tremblers, and the New World catbirds. These birds are notable for their vocalization, especially their remarkable ability to mimic a wide variety of birds and other sounds heard outdoors. The species tend towards dull grays and browns in their appearance.

- Gray catbird, Dumetella carolinensis (Unc)
- Curve-billed thrasher, Toxostoma curvirostre
- Brown thrasher, Toxostoma rufum (Unc)
- Long-billed thrasher, Toxostoma longirostre (R)
- Crissal thrasher, Toxostoma crissale
- Sage thrasher, Oreoscoptes montanus (Unc)
- Northern mockingbird, Mimus polyglottos

== Starlings ==
Order: Passeriformes Family: Sturnidae

Starlings and mynas are small to medium-sized Old World passerine birds with strong feet. Their flight is strong and direct and most are very gregarious. Their preferred habitat is fairly open country, and they eat insects and fruit. The plumage of several species is dark with a metallic sheen.

- European starling, Sturnus vulgaris (I) (R)

== Dippers ==
Order: Passeriformes Family: Cinclidae

Dippers are a group of perching birds whose habitat includes aquatic environments in the Americas, Europe, and Asia. These birds have adaptations which allows them to submerge and walk on the bottom to feed on insect larvae.

- American dipper, Cinclus mexicanus (O)

== Thrushes and allies ==
Order: Passeriformes Family: Turdidae

The thrushes are a group of passerine birds that occur mainly but not exclusively in the Old World. They are plump, soft plumaged, small to medium-sized insectivores or sometimes omnivores, often feeding on the ground. Many have attractive songs.

- Eastern bluebird, Sialia sialis
- Western bluebird, Sialia mexicana (Unc)
- Mountain bluebird, Sialia currucoides (R)
- Townsend's solitaire, Myadestes townsendi
- Veery, Catharus fuscescens (O)
- Gray-cheeked thrush, Catharus minimus (R)
- Swainson's thrush, Catharus ustulatus (Unc)
- Hermit thrush, Catharus guttatus
- Wood thrush, Hylocichla mustelina (R)
- Clay-colored thrush, Turdus grayi (O)
- Rufous-backed robin, Turdus rufopalliatus (O)
- American robin, Turdus migratorius
- Varied thrush, Ixoreus naevius (R)
- Aztec thrush, Ridgwayia pinicola (O)

== Olive warbler ==
Order: Passeriformes Family: Peucedramidae

The olive warbler has a gray body with some olive-green on the wings and two white wing bars. The male's head and breast are orange and there is a black patch through the eye. This is the only species in its family.

- Olive warbler, Peucedramus taeniatus (O)

== Old World sparrows ==
Order: Passeriformes Family: Passeridae

Old World sparrows are small passerine birds. In general, sparrows tend to be small plump brownish or grayish birds with short tails and short powerful beaks. Sparrows are seed eaters, but they also consume small insects.

- House sparrow, Passer domesticus (I)

== Wagtails and pipits ==
Order: Passeriformes Family: Motacillidae

Motacillidae is a family of small passerine birds with medium to long tails. They include the wagtails, longclaws, and pipits. They are slender ground-feeding insectivores of open country.

- American pipit, Anthus rubescens
- Sprague's pipit, Anthus spragueii (R)

== Finches, euphonias, and allies ==
Order: Passeriformes Family: Fringillidae

Finches are seed-eating passerine birds that are small to moderately large and have a strong beak, usually conical and in some species very large. All have twelve tail feathers and nine primaries. These birds have a bouncing flight with alternating bouts of flapping and gliding on closed wings, and most sing well.

- Evening grosbeak, Coccothraustes vespertinus (O)
- House finch, Haemorhous mexicanus
- Purple finch, Haemorhous purpureus (R)
- Cassin's finch, Haemorhous cassinii (R)
- Red crossbill, Loxia curvirostra (R)
- Pine siskin, Spinus pinus
- Lesser goldfinch, Spinus psaltria
- American goldfinch, Spinus tristis (Unc)

== Longspurs and snow buntings ==
Order: Passeriformes Family: Calcariidae

The Calcariidae are a group of passerine birds that had been traditionally grouped with the New World sparrows, but differ in a number of respects and are usually found in open grassy areas.

- Chestnut-collared longspur, Calcarius ornatus (Unc)
- Smith's longspur, Calcarius pictus (O)
- Snow bunting, Plectrophenax nivalis (O)

== New World sparrows ==
Order: Passeriformes Family: Passerellidae

Until 2017, these species were considered part of the family Emberizidae. Most of the species are known as sparrows, but these birds are not closely related to the Old World sparrows which are in the family Passeridae. Many of these have distinctive head patterns.

- Cassin's sparrow, Peucaea cassinii (Unc)
- Grasshopper sparrow, Ammodramus savannarum (Unc)
- Black-throated sparrow, Amphispiza bilineata
- Lark sparrow, Chondestes grammacus
- Lark bunting, Calamospiza melanocorys
- Chipping sparrow, Spizella passerina
- Clay-colored sparrow, Spizella pallida (Unc)
- Black-chinned sparrow, Spizella atrogularis
- Field sparrow, Spizella pusilla (R)
- Brewer's sparrow, Spizella breweri
- Fox sparrow, Passerella iliaca (R)
- Dark-eyed junco, Junco hyemalis
- Yellow-eyed junco, Junco phaeonotus (O)
- White-crowned sparrow, Zonotrichia leucophrys
- Golden-crowned sparrow, Zonotrichia atricapilla (O)
- Harris's sparrow, Zonotrichia querula (O)
- White-throated sparrow, Zonotrichia albicollis (Unc)
- Sagebrush sparrow, Artemisiospiza nevadensis (Unc)
- Vesper sparrow, Pooecetes gramineus
- LeConte's sparrow, Ammospiza leconteii (R)
- Baird's sparrow, Centronyx bairdii (Unc)
- Savannah sparrow, Passerculus sandwichensis
- Song sparrow, Melospiza melodia (Unc)
- Lincoln's sparrow, Melospiza lincolnii
- Swamp sparrow, Melospiza georgiana
- Rufous-crowned sparrow, Aimophila ruficeps
- Green-tailed towhee, Pipilo chlorurus
- Spotted towhee, Pipilo maculatus

== Yellow-breasted chat ==
Order: Passeriformes Family: Icteriidae

This species was historically placed in the wood-warblers (Parulidae) but nonetheless most authorities were unsure if it belonged there. It was placed in its own family in 2017.

- Yellow-breasted chat, Icteria virens

== Troupials and allies ==
Order: Passeriformes Family: Icteridae

The icterids are a group of small to medium-sized, often colorful passerine birds restricted to the New World and include the grackles, New World blackbirds, and New World orioles. Most species have black as a predominant plumage color which is often enlivened by yellow, orange, or red.

- Yellow-headed blackbird, Xanthocephalus xanthocephalus
- Eastern meadowlark, Sturnella magna
- Western meadowlark, Sturnella neglecta (Unc)
- Black-vented oriole, Icterus wagleri (O)
- Orchard oriole, Icterus spurius
- Hooded oriole, Icterus cucullatus
- Bullock's oriole, Icterus bullockii
- Baltimore oriole, Icterus galbula (R)
- Scott's oriole, Icterus parisorum
- Red-winged blackbird, Agelaius phoeniceus (Unc)
- Bronzed cowbird, Molothrus aeneus (Unc)
- Brown-headed cowbird, Molothrus ater
- Rusty blackbird, Euphagus carolinus (R)
- Brewer's blackbird, Euphagus cyanocephalus
- Common grackle, Quiscalus quiscula (R)
- Great-tailed grackle, Quiscalus mexicanus (Unc)

== New World warblers ==
Order: Passeriformes Family: Parulidae

The wood-warblers are a group of small often colorful passerine birds restricted to the New World. Most are arboreal, but some are more terrestrial. Most members of this family are insectivores.

- Ovenbird, Seiurus aurocapilla (Unc)
- Worm-eating warbler, Helmitheros vermivorum (R)
- Louisiana waterthrush, Parkesia motacilla (R)
- Northern waterthrush, Parkesia noveboracensis (Unc)
- Golden-winged warbler, Vermivora chrysoptera (R)
- Blue-winged warbler, Vermivora cyanoptera (R)
- Black-and-white warbler, Mniotilta varia
- Prothonotary warbler, Protonotaria citrea (R)
- Swainson's warbler, Limnothlypis swainsonii (R)
- Crescent-chested warbler, Leiothlypis superciliosa (O)
- Tennessee warbler, Leiothlypis peregrina (R)
- Orange-crowned warbler, Leiothlypis celata
- Colima warbler, Leiothlypis crissalis
- Nashville warbler, Leiothlypis ruficapilla
- MacGillivray's warbler, Geothlypis tolmiei
- Mourning warbler, Geothlypis philadelphia (R)
- Kentucky warbler, Geothlypis formosa (R)
- Common yellowthroat, Geothlypis trichas
- Hooded warbler, Setophaga citrina (Unc)
- American redstart, Setophaga ruticilla
- Cape May warbler, Setophaga tigrina (R)
- Cerulean warbler, Setophaga cerulea (R)
- Northern parula, Setophaga americana
- Tropical parula, Setophaga pitiayumi (R)
- Magnolia warbler, Setophaga magnolia (R)
- Bay-breasted warbler, Setophaga castanea (R)
- Blackburnian warbler, Setophaga fusca (R)
- Yellow warbler, Setophaga petechia
- Chestnut-sided warbler, Setophaga pensylvanica (R)
- Blackpoll warbler, Setophaga striata (R)
- Black-throated blue warbler, Setophaga caerulescens (Unc)
- Palm warbler, Setophaga palmarum (R)
- Pine warbler, Setophaga pinus (R)
- Yellow-rumped warbler, Setophaga coronata
- Yellow-throated warbler, Setophaga dominica (Unc)
- Prairie warbler, Setophaga discolor (R)
- Grace's warbler, Setophaga graciae (R)
- Black-throated gray warbler, Setophaga nigrescens (Unc)
- Townsend's warbler, Setophaga townsendi
- Hermit warbler, Setophaga occidentalis (Unc)
- Golden-cheeked warbler, Setophaga chrysoparia (R)
- Black-throated green warbler, Setophaga virens (Unc)
- Fan-tailed warbler, Euthlypis lachrymosa (O)
- Rufous-capped warbler, Basileuterus rufifrons (O)
- Canada warbler, Cardellina canadensis (R)
- Wilson's warbler, Cardellina pusilla
- Red-faced warbler, Cardellina rubrifrons (R)
- Painted redstart, Myioborus pictus
- Slate-throated redstart, Myioborus miniatus (O)

== Cardinals and allies ==
Order: Passeriformes Family: Cardinalidae

The cardinals are a family of robust seed-eating birds with strong bills. They are typically associated with open woodland. The sexes usually have distinct plumages.

- Hepatic tanager, Piranga flava (Unc)
- Summer tanager, Piranga rubra
- Scarlet tanager, Piranga olivacea (R)
- Western tanager, Piranga ludoviciana
- Flame-colored tanager, Piranga bidentata (R)
- Northern cardinal, Cardinalis cardinalis
- Pyrrhuloxia, Cardinalis sinuatus
- Rose-breasted grosbeak, Pheucticus ludovicianus (R)
- Black-headed grosbeak, Pheucticus melanocephalus
- Blue grosbeak, Passerina caerulea
- Lazuli bunting, Passerina amoena (Unc)
- Indigo bunting, Passerina cyanea
- Varied bunting, Passerina versicolor
- Painted bunting, Passerina ciris
- Dickcissel, Spiza americana (Unc)

== See also ==
- List of birds of Texas
