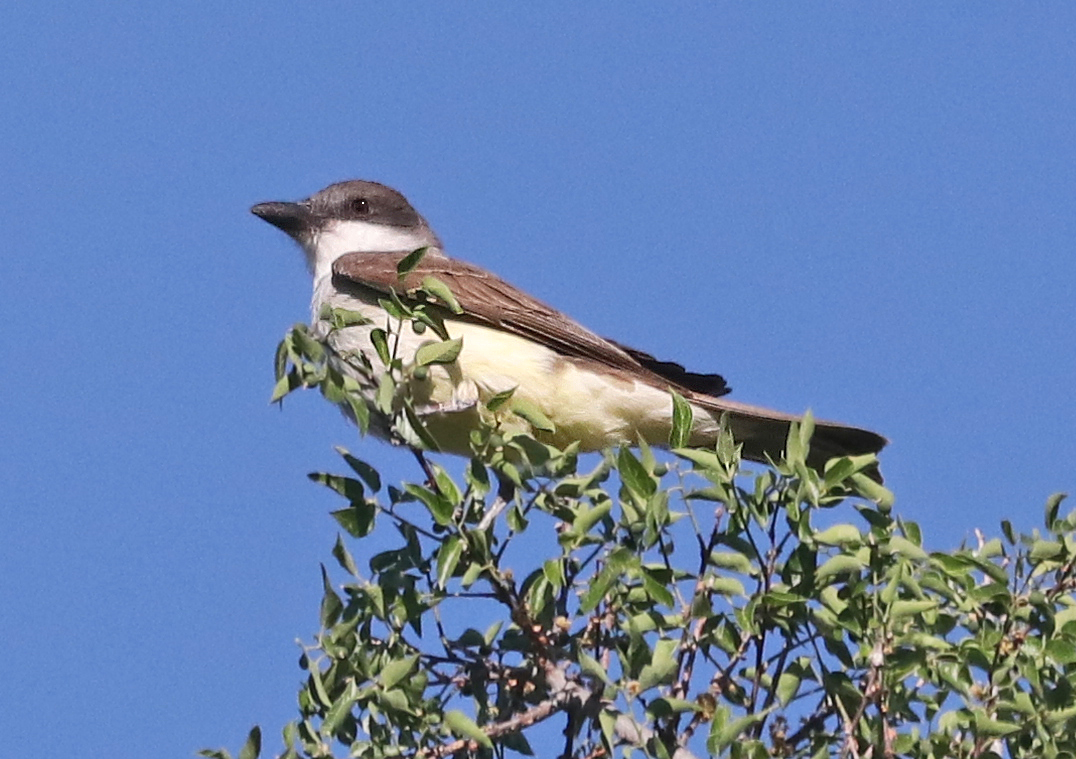

Conservation status
- Least Concern (IUCN 3.1)

Scientific classification
- Kingdom: Animalia
- Phylum: Chordata
- Class: Aves
- Order: Passeriformes
- Family: Tyrannidae
- Genus: Tyrannus
- Species: T. crassirostris

Binomial name
- Tyrannus crassirostris Swainson, 1826
- Breeding Non-Breeding Year-round

= Thick-billed kingbird =

Species of bird

The thick-billed kingbird (Tyrannus crassirostris) is a large member of the family Tyrannidae, the tyrant flycatchers. It is found in the southwestern United States, Mexico, and Guatemala.

== Taxonomy and systematics ==
The thick-billed kingbird has two subspecies, the nominate T. c. crassirostris (Swainson, 1826) and T. c. pompalis (Bangs & Peters, JL, 1928). The differences between them are slight and some authors suggest that the two should be merged.

== Description ==
The thick-billed kingbird is about 25 cm (9.8 in) long and weighs about 52 to 59 g (1.8 to 2.1 oz). Females are slightly smaller than males and the sexes have essentially the same plumage. Adults of the nominate subspecies have a dark grayish brown forehead, crown, lores, and ear coverts; their cheeks are white. The crown feathers form a slight crest. Both sexes have a partially hidden lemon or canary yellow patch in the center of the crown though females' are narrower. Both sexes have a grayish brown nape that is paler than the rest of the head. Their upperparts are mostly grayish olive with grayish brown uppertail coverts. Their wings are mostly deep grayish brown with pale grayish olive lesser coverts. Their remiges have thin pale buffy brown or cinnamon edges on their upper side and thin yellowish white edges on the inner webs on the underside. Their tail is deep grayish brown with pale buffy brown or cinnamon edges on the feathers. Their chin and throat are white, their breast whitish to very pale gray, and their sides, flanks, and undertail coverts very pale canary to deep primrose yellow. Subspecies T. c. pompalis is described as having less olive upperparts and paler yellow underparts than the nominate, but these differences have also been attributed to feather wear. Both subspecies have a dark iris, a stout dark bill, and blackish legs and feet.

== Distribution and habitat ==
Subspecies T. c. pompalis of the thick-billed kingbird is the more northerly of the two. It is found in the U.S. in extreme southeastern Arizona and extreme southwestern New Mexico and south from there on the Pacific side of Mexico to Colima. There are a few nesting records from the Big Bend region of southern Texas. The subspecies has also strayed further north in Arizona and to British Colombia, California, Colorado, and Baja California. The nominate subspecies is found on the western side of Mexico from Colima south to Chiapas and occasionally occurs in western Guatemala.

The thick-billed kingbird inhabits different landscapes in different parts of its range. In the U.S. it breeds along streams and rivers with somewhat open floodplains rather than in narrow canyons. Further south it is found within tropical deciduous forest and less frequently in riparian zones and in the far south it is found in riparian zones within arid scrublands. In elevation it ranges as high as 2,000 m (6,600 ft).

== Behavior ==
=== Movement ===
The thick-billed kingbird is a partial migrant. It is found year-round in Mexico from southern Chihuahua south to western Oaxaca. In this range are resident individuals, migrants from the north, and breeding birds that migrate south. Most if not all of the populations in Arizona, New Mexico, and northern Chihuahua move south into the year-round range after the breeding season, though their exact wintering range is not known. Some members of subspecies T. c. pompalis move south from the year-round range into Chiapas and occasionally into Guatemala.

=== Feeding ===
The thick-billed kingbird feeds on insects, other arthropods, and to a smaller degree fruits, though details are lacking. It catches prey in mid-air with sallies from a high perch ("hawking").

=== Breeding ===
The migratory northern population of thick-billed kingbirds arrives in their breeding range in April and May and departs in September. The species usually nests high in tall trees though nests have been found as low as 1.5 m (5 ft) above the ground. Its nest is a loose cup made from thin twigs and grass stems typically placed in a branch fork or in the crotch where a branch meets the tree trunk. The clutch is three to five eggs that are creamy white to pale buff with brown and lilac spots and blotches. The incubation period is thought to be about 16 days and fledging is thought to occur about 16 to 18 days after hatch. Apparently only the female incubates the clutch and broods nestlings.

=== Vocalization ===
The thick-billed kingbird has a variety of calls that apparently have different functions. The most frequent is a "[t]wo-parted phrase, T t t t t, t T t tt rwheeuh t tt". Others include chatters, a "loud, rasping tch-uhrreeE, a "harsh ruhr", and a "clear tch-rroy".

== Status ==
The IUCN has assessed the thick-billed kingbird as being of Least Concern. It has a very large range; its population is estimated at two million mature individuals but the trend is not known. No immediate threats have been identified.
