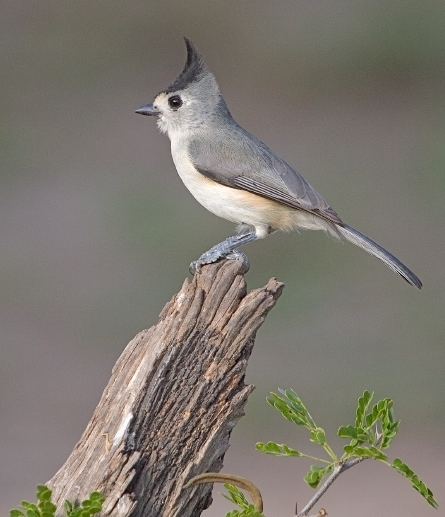

Conservation status
- Least Concern (IUCN 3.1)

Scientific classification
- Kingdom: Animalia
- Phylum: Chordata
- Class: Aves
- Order: Passeriformes
- Family: Paridae
- Genus: Baeolophus
- Species: B. atricristatus

Binomial name
- Baeolophus atricristatus (Cassin, 1850)
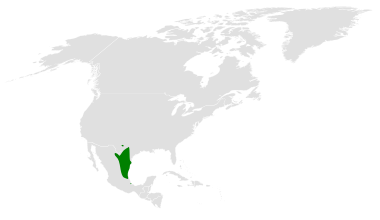
- Range of Baeolophus atricristatus

= Black-crested titmouse =

Species of bird

The black-crested titmouse or Mexican titmouse (Baeolophus atricristatus), is a passerine bird in the family Paridae, the tits and chickadees. It is found in Mexico and the U. S. states of Oklahoma and Texas and as a vagrant in at least one other state.

== Taxonomy and systematics ==
The black-crested titmouse was originally described in 1850 as Parus atricristatus. It was later reassigned to its present genus Baeolophus that was erected in 1851. Still later it was treated as conspecific with the tufted titmouse (B. bicolor). As early as 1988 it was treated by some taxonomists as a separate species and the American Ornithological Society did so in 2002. The black-crested and tufted titmice hybridize in a narrow zone in Oklahoma and Texas.

The black-crested titmouse has these three subspecies:

- B. a. paloduro Stevenson, JO, 1940
- B. a. sennetti Ridgway, 1904
- B. a. atricristatus (Cassin, 1850)

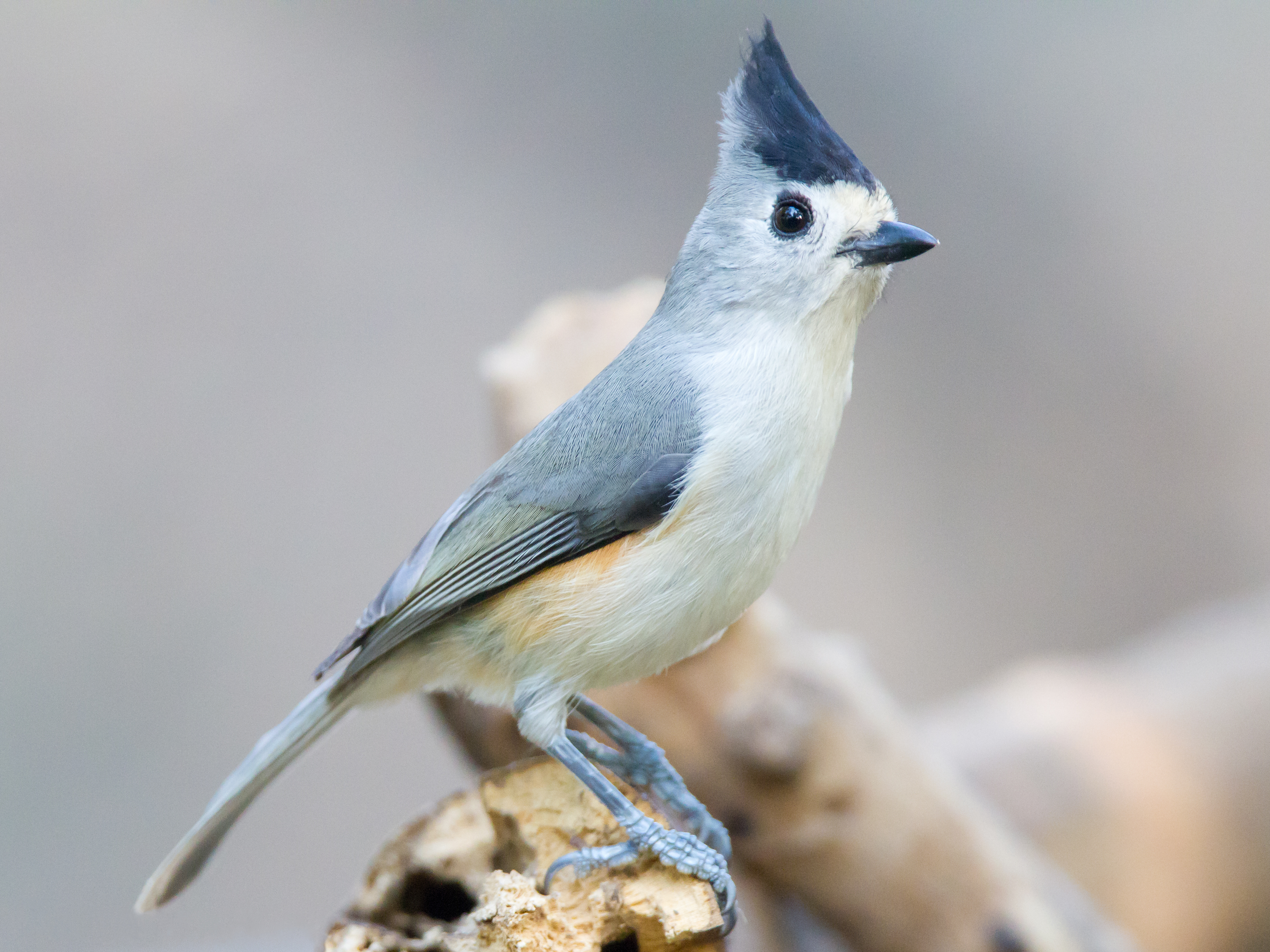
Black-crested titmouse in Santa Ana National Wildlife Refuge, Texas

== Description ==
The black-crested titmouse is about 15 cm (5.9 in) long and weighs about 16.5 g (0.58 oz). It is a moderately large member of its family and has a distinct crest. The sexes have the almost the same plumage. Adult males of the nominate subspecies B. a. atricristatus have the eponymous black crest; female's crests are dark gray. Both sexes have a buffy-white forehead, white lores, a white eye-ring with a black spot above it, and pale gray ear coverts. Their upperparts are deep plumbeous gray with a greenish cast on the mantle and rump. Their wings and tail are plumbeous gray with greenish gray edges on the primaries and tail feathers and pale gray edges on the primary coverts. Their throat and underparts are white and their flanks a rich cinnamon-rufous. They have a dark brown iris, a black bill, and bluish gray to dark bluish legs and feet. Juveniles have a shorter crest than adults; their crest is gray, their eye-ring buffy, their wing coverts washed with brown, their underparts grayish white, and their flanks light pinkish buff. Subspecies B. a. paloduro is almost indistinguishable from the nominate. B. a. sennetti has medium gray upperparts.

== Distribution and habitat ==
The subspecies of the black-crested titmouse are found thus:

- B. a. paloduro: from the Davis Mountains in western Texas south into Mexico's northern Coahuila state; disjunctly in the Texas panhandle
- B. a. sennetti: from southwestern Oklahoma south into central and southern Texas
- B. a. atricristatus: from the lower Rio Grande Valley in Texas south through eastern Mexico to eastern San Luis Potosí, northeastern Hidalgo, and central Veracruz states

The species has also been recorded as a vagrant in New Mexico. An apparent record in Massachusetts has not been ratified by the state's Avian Records Committee.

The black-crested titmouse inhabits a variety of landscapes including evergreen, semi-deciduous, and deciduous forest and woodlands. Primary, secondary, and gallery forest types are all represented, and the species especially favors those dominated by oaks (Quercus) and mesquite (Prosopis). It also inhabits human-modified landscapes such as orchards, parks, and residential areas. In elevation it ranges from sea level to about 2,300 m (7,500 ft).

== Behavior ==
=== Movement ===
The black-crested titmouse is year-round resident.

=== Feeding ===
The black-crested titmouse feeds mostly on a wide variety of insects, their larvae, and their eggs. It also eats nuts and seeds, berries, corn, and some human-provided foods like suet and bread. It forages rather deliberately, taking food from trunks, branches, and foliage and mostly in the inner parts of trees. It is not known to store food, though other members of family Paridae do so regularly. In winter it often forages in mixed-species feeding flocks with other parids, kinglets, gnatcatchers, and warblers.

=== Breeding ===
The black-crested titmouse breeds between February and late June in Texas; its season in Mexico is not known. It nests primarily in holes made and abandoned by woodpeckers which can be in living and dead trees, fence posts, and utility poles. It also breeds in nest boxes. The cavity is lined with a wide variety of soft materials including animal hair, moss, grass, bark strips, and human-made materials like fabric and string. The most common clutch is six eggs but clutches of four to seven are known. The eggs are white or pinkish white with small reddish brown speckles. The incubation period is 12 to 14 days and the female alone is believed to incubate. Fledging occurs 15 to 18 days after hatch. Both parents are believed to provision nestlings.

=== Vocalization ===
The black-crested titmouse's song is "five to seven rapidly delivered slurred phrases peew peew peew peew peew". One of its calls is "a series of angry, nasal, rising notes often preceded by very high, thin notes: ti ti ti sii sii zhree zhree zhree". Some other calls include "chick-a-dee", "tsee-chup or see-cheyay", "tseet or tsit", "an excited sit-sit-sit", "a thin zeep", and a "melodious tee-pleur".

== Status ==
The IUCN has assessed the black-crested titmouse as being of Least Concern. It has a very large range; its estimated population of 1.2 million mature individuals is believed to be increasing. No immediate threats have been identified. It is considered common overall but uncommon and local in western Texas.
