= Snowy =

Snowy may refer to:

== People ==
=== Nickname ===
- Snowy Baker (1884–1953), Australian athlete, sports promoter, and actor
- John "Snowy" Cutmore (1895–1927), Australian gangster
- Snowy Evans (c. 1891–1925), Australian machine gunner considered likely to have fired the shot that killed Manfred von Richthofen, "the Red Baron"
- Snowy Farr (1919–2007), English charity fundraiser for the Guide Dogs for the Blind Association
- Bert Peters (1908–1944), Australian rules footballer
- Snowy Rowles (died 1932), Australian perpetrator of the Murchison Murders
- Kenneth Svenson (1898–1955), New Zealand rugby union player

=== Stage name ===
- Snowy Fleet, Australian drummer Gordon Fleet (born 1945)
- Snowy Shaw, Swedish heavy metal musician born Tommie Helgesson (born 1968)
- Snowy White, English guitarist Terence White (born 1948)

=== Given name ===
- Snowy Khoza, South African business executive

== Other uses ==
- Snowy River (disambiguation)
- Snowy Mountain (disambiguation)
- Snowy (military dog) (2004–2011), a tracking dog for the Sri Lanka Army
- Snowy (character), a fictional dog in the comics series The Adventures of Tintin by Hergé
- Snowy (TV series), a 1993 Australian television drama series
- Snowy, a video game series produced by Aliasworlds Entertainment
- "Snowy", a track from the soundtrack of the 2015 video game Undertale by Toby Fox

== See also ==
- Snowy egret
- Snowy owl
- Snowy plover
- Snowy-bellied hummingbird
- Snowy-browed flycatcher
- Snowy sheathbill
- Western snowy plover
- Snowy-crowned robin-chat
- Snowy-crowned tern
- Snowy cotinga
- Snowy-cheeked laughingthrush
- Snowy-throated babbler
- Snowy-throated kingbird
- Snowy grouper
- Snowy albatross
