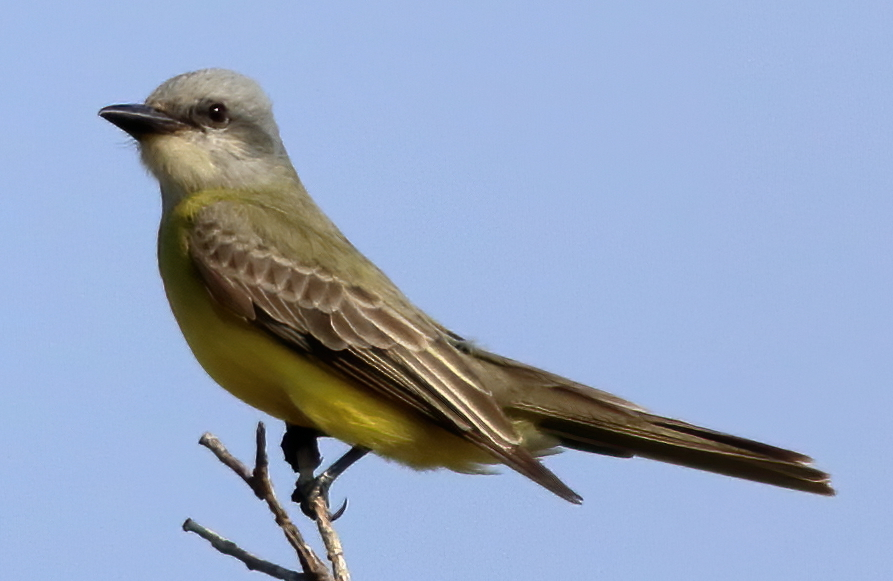

Conservation status
- Least Concern (IUCN 3.1)

Scientific classification
- Kingdom: Animalia
- Phylum: Chordata
- Class: Aves
- Order: Passeriformes
- Family: Tyrannidae
- Genus: Tyrannus
- Species: T. couchii

Binomial name
- Tyrannus couchii S.F. Baird, 1858

= Couch's kingbird =

Species of bird

Couch's kingbird (Tyrannus couchii) is a passerine tyrant flycatcher of the kingbird genus. It is found from southern Texas along the Gulf Coast to the Yucatán Peninsula in Mexico, Belize and northern Guatemala. It is also found in the lower stretches of the Rio Grande Valley.

The species is named after soldier and naturalist Darius N. Couch.

== Description ==
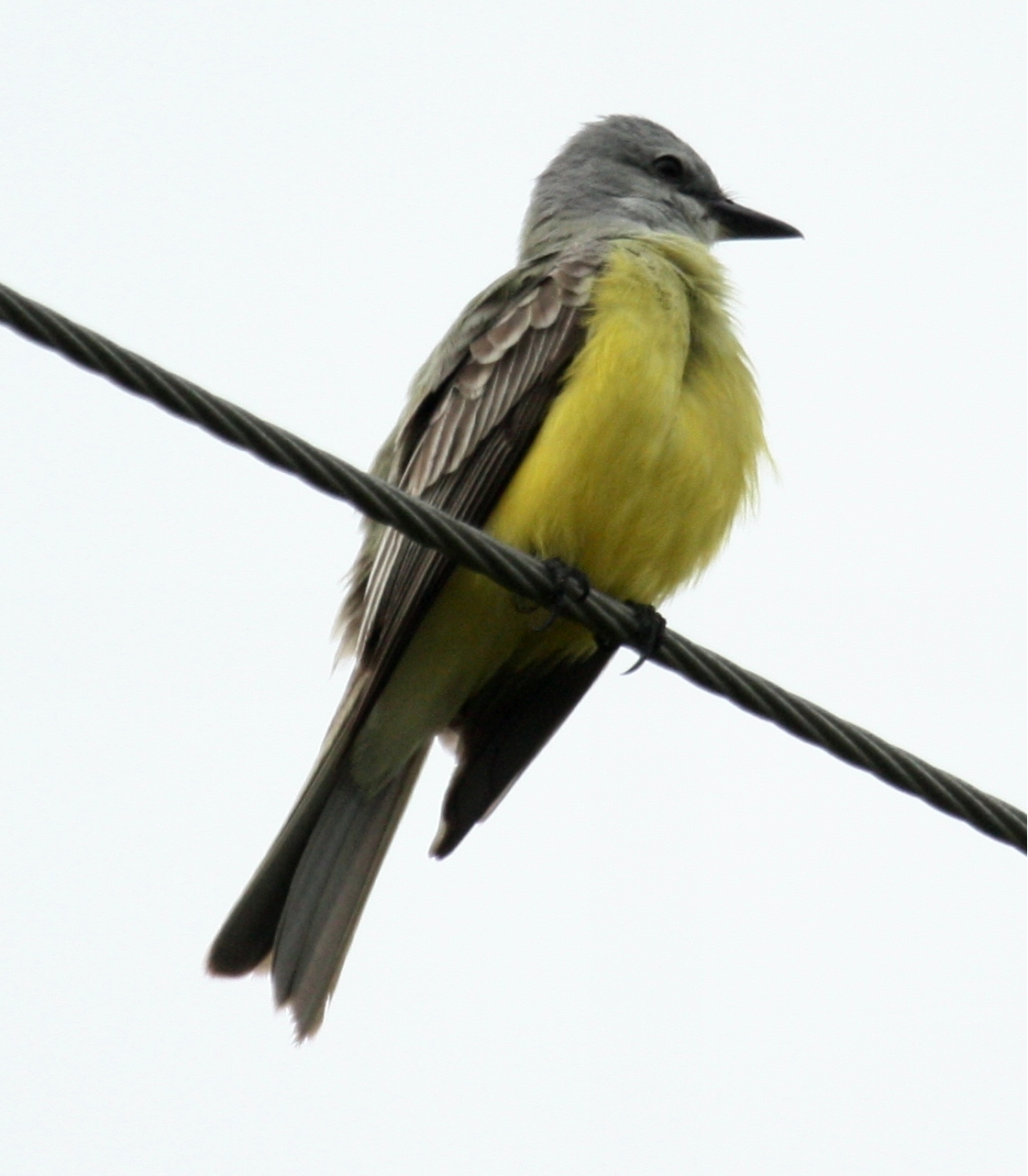
Santa Ana State Park, Texas

Couch's kingbird is about 7 inches long. It has a large head and bill. It has a dark, forked tail. The head is pale gray with contrasting darker cheeks. The upperparts are grayish-olive. It has a pale throat and a darker breast. The lower breast is bright yellow. Juveniles have browner underparts than the adult and pale edges to their wings.

== Similar species ==
Couch's kingbird can easily be confused with the related tropical kingbird (T. melancholicus), which is extremely similar. In fact, Couch's kingbird was considered conspecific with the tropical kingbird until 1979. The easiest way to distinguish between the two species is to listen for their call: Couch's kingbird has a raspier, more complex call that is more varied in pitch. In addition, Couch's kingbird lives in a more wooded environment than the tropical kingbird, which lives in a more open environment. Cassin's kingbird (T. vociferans) can also be mistaken for Couch's kingbird. Cassin's kingbird has a darker head color and white tips on its outer tail feathers. Couch's kingbird can be distinguished from the western kingbird (Tyrannus verticalis) by their white outer tail feathers (like Cassin's kingbird) and their chest color. Western kingbirds have a grey area on the chest that extends downward from the head, which Couch's kingbirds do not have.

== Distribution and habitat ==
Couch's kingbird is native to southern Texas, eastern Mexico, Belize, and northeastern Guatemala, living in lightly wooded areas, such as sparse forests, suburban areas, thorn forests, and edges of wooded streams. Couch's kingbird likes to live near water, especially rivers, and can often be found near roadsides and forest edges. A vagrant individual was sighted in New York City in December 2014 and caught the attention of many birdwatchers.

== Behavior ==
=== Diet and feeding ===
Couch's kingbird is mostly an insectivore; however, it can also be a frugivore, eating small berries and seeds. They typically eat larger insects such as, but not limited to, beetles, grasshoppers, wasps, and large flies. Besides this, their diet is mostly unknown due to the lesser volume of birders noting this bird's behaviors. Like most kingbirds, the feeding behavior of Couch's kingbird entails mostly perching and watching its environment for insect movement. It catches its prey mid-air, hovering above, or by quickly swooping down. Eventually, Couch's kingbird re-perches on a branch to eat the insects.

=== Reproduction ===
The nesting behavior is not precisely known; however, it is believed to be similar to the tropical kingbird. Couch's kingbird likes to nest in lightly wooded areas, and they frequently nest in sugar hackberry, cedar elm, Texas ebony, and Mexican ash trees. It is believed that the flat, cup-like nest is most likely built by the female. It usually consists of twigs, leaves, weeds, moss, and bark and is lined with soft, finer materials such as rootlets, plant down, and Spanish moss. It lays horizontally on higher altitude branches ranging 8–25 feet above the ground, aggressively guarded by adults chasing away larger birds from the nest site. The incubation period is not known but is estimated to be by the female for a little over two weeks. The female can lay up to five eggs, but there are normally three to four eggs per nest. The eggs look to be a pinkish-warm buff color splotched with darker browns and lavender. It is believed both parents feed the young, but not much is known. The young's age at first flight is around 2–3 weeks old.

== Threats ==
The conservation status of Couch's kingbird is of the least concern since the population seems to be increasing. In Texas, the population is stable, however, its population in Mexico fluctuates due to urbanization and total deforestation.
