= Snow Creek =

Snow Creek may refer to:

== Communities ==
- Snow Creek, California, an unincorporated community in Riverside County
- Snow Creek Township, Stokes County, North Carolina

== Water resources ==
- Snow Creek, a tributary of the Whitewater River in California
- Snow Creek Falls, Yosemite National Park, California
- Snow Creek (Mahantango Creek tributary) in Northumberland County, Pennsylvania
- Snow Creek (Manitoba) in Snow Lake, Manitoba, outlet for Snow Lake, draining into Wekusko Lake
- Snow Creek (Missouri), a stream in Missouri
- Snow Creek (Washington state), a tributary of Icicle Creek
- Snow Creek Glacier, Wenatchee National Forest, Washington State

== Other uses ==
- Snow Creek Methodist Church and Burying Ground, near Statesville, Iredell County, North Carolina, on the National Register of Historic Places
- Snow Creek (ski resort), in Missouri
- Snow Creek Placer Claim No. 1 in the Cape Nome Mining District Discovery Sites in Alaska

== See also ==
- Snow River in Alaska
- Snow River (New Zealand)
- Snowy River (disambiguation)
