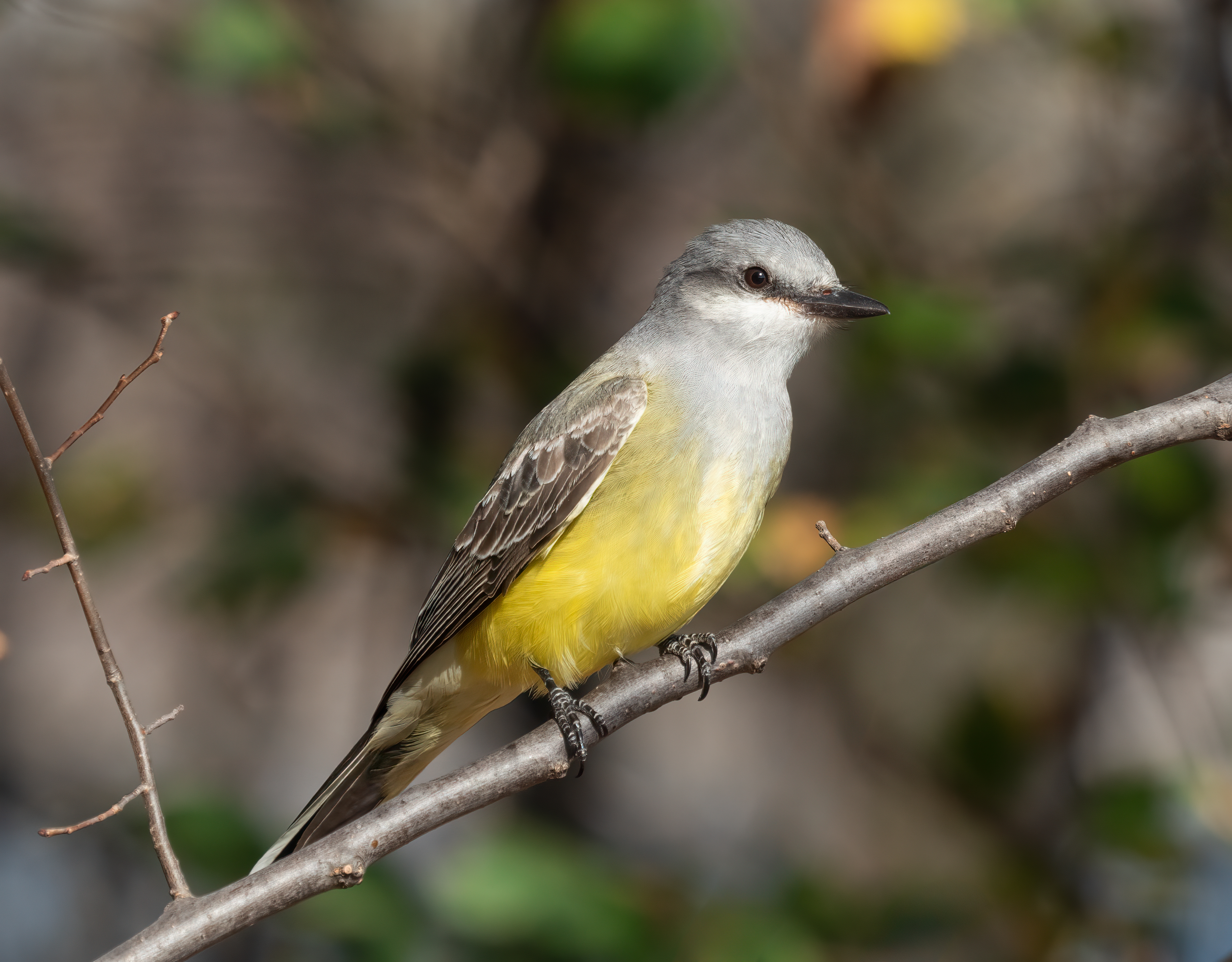

Conservation status
- Least Concern (IUCN 3.1)

Scientific classification
- Kingdom: Animalia
- Phylum: Chordata
- Class: Aves
- Order: Passeriformes
- Family: Tyrannidae
- Genus: Tyrannus
- Species: T. verticalis

Binomial name
- Tyrannus verticalis Say, 1822
- Distribution Breeding Migration Nonbreeding

= Western kingbird =

Species of bird

The western kingbird (Tyrannus verticalis) is a large tyrant flycatcher found throughout western North America, as far south as Mexico.

== Description ==
Adults are a combination of both gray and yellow plumage, along with crimson feathers that are hidden until courtship or against intruders. Characteristic of kingbird species, the western kingbird is very territorial. Although the western is often misidentified as Cassin's kingbird, Couch's kingbird, or the tropical kingbird due to the yellow coloration, it can be distinguished from these other species through its black, squared tail with white edges.

== Anatomy and morphology ==
Standard Measurements
length	8–9.3 in (200–240 mm)
weight	40 g (1.4 oz)
wingspan	15.5 in (390 mm)
wing	125.5–133.5 mm (4.94–5.26 in)
tail	88.5–96.5 mm (3.48–3.80 in)
culmen	20.5–22.5 mm (0.81–0.89 in)
tarsus	18.5–19.5 mm (0.73–0.77 in)

== Distribution and habitat ==
Western kingbird nest

The breeding habitat is open areas in western North America. The increased presence of trees throughout the Great Plains during the past century due to fire suppression and tree planting facilitated the range expansion of the western kingbird, as well as range expansions of many other species of birds.

Instances of hybridization with the closely related Eastern Kingbird (Tyrannus tyrannus) have been reported. Hybridization between the two species may become more frequent as the expanding range of the Western Kingbird increasingly overlaps with that of the Eastern Kingbird.

== Behavior ==
The name kingbird is derived from their "take-charge" behavior. These birds aggressively defend their territory and will harass larger birds such as ravens or hawks if they stray too close to their nests.

Kingbirds make a sturdy cup nest in a tree or shrub, sometimes on top of a pole or other man-made structure. Three to five white, creamy, or pinkish eggs with heavy blotches of brown, black, or lavender are laid and incubated for 12 to 14 days. Due to the small size of the nest, and the chicks' rapid rate of growth, most of them are pushed out of the nest, due to overcrowding, before they are fully feathered and able to fly.

They wait on an open perch and fly out to catch insects such as bees, robber flies, winged ants, grasshoppers, and spiders. They are also known to eat berries, buckthorn/sumac, and poison ivy seeds.

These birds migrate in flocks to Florida and the Pacific coast of southern Mexico and Central America.

== Sound ==
Vocalizations from this species often consist of a long series of squeaky bubbling calls, sometimes compared to a squeaky toy. Another common vocalization is a loud accented kip call.
