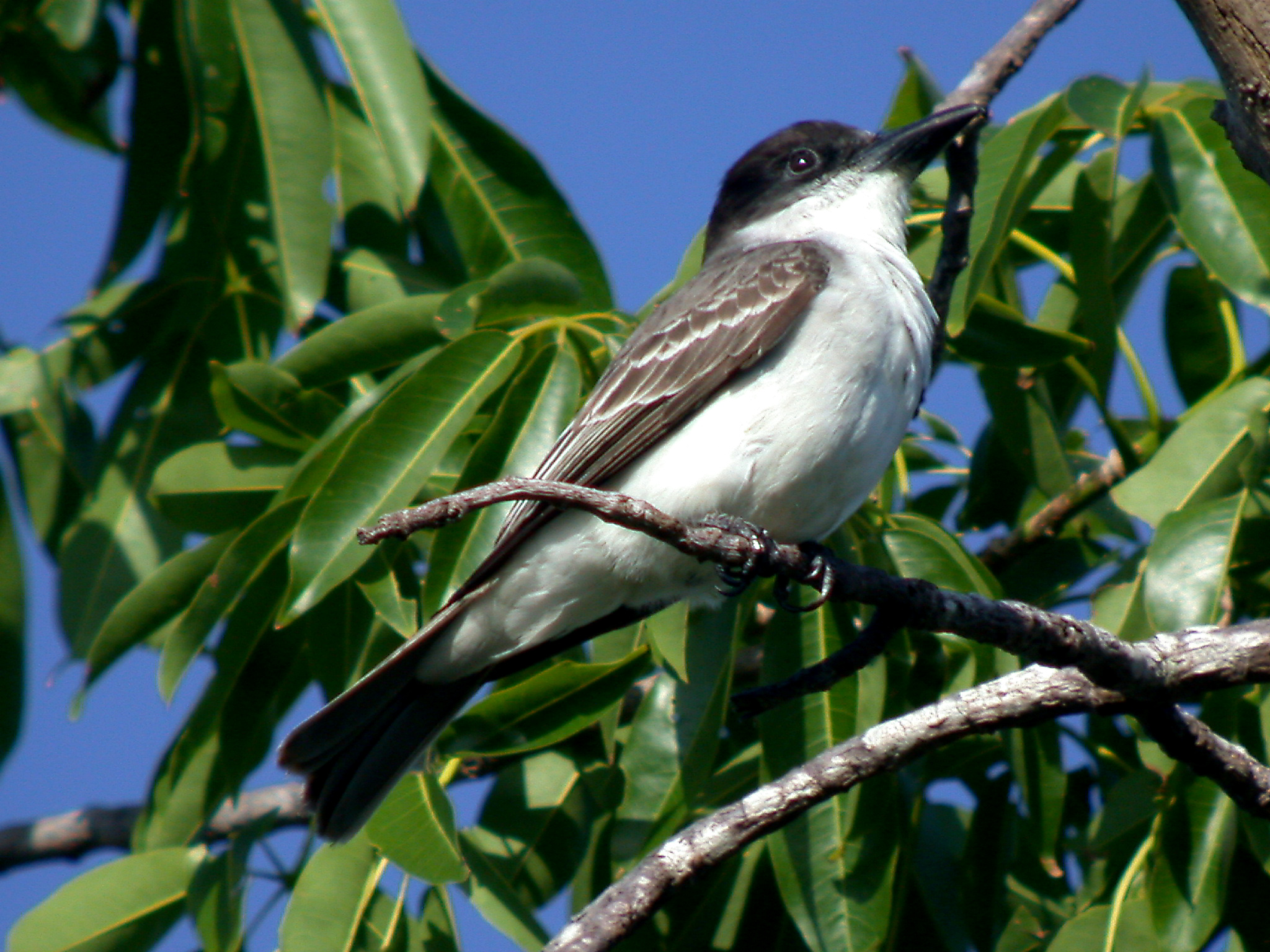

Conservation status
- Endangered (IUCN 3.1)

Scientific classification
- Kingdom: Animalia
- Phylum: Chordata
- Class: Aves
- Order: Passeriformes
- Family: Tyrannidae
- Genus: Tyrannus
- Species: T. cubensis

Binomial name
- Tyrannus cubensis Richmond, 1898

= Giant kingbird =

Species of bird in Cuba

The giant kingbird (Tyrannus cubensis) is an endangered species of bird in the tyrant flycatcher family Tyrannidae. It is endemic to Cuba.

== Taxonomy and systematics ==
The giant kingbird was originally assigned the binomial Tyrannus magnirostris in 1839. However, that name had already been used for another species, so by the principle of priority Richmond named it the current Tyrannus cubensis in 1898. The giant kingbird and the grey kingbird (T. dominicensis) are sister species and the pair are probably sister to the tropical kingbird (T. melancholicus).

The giant kingbird is monotypic.

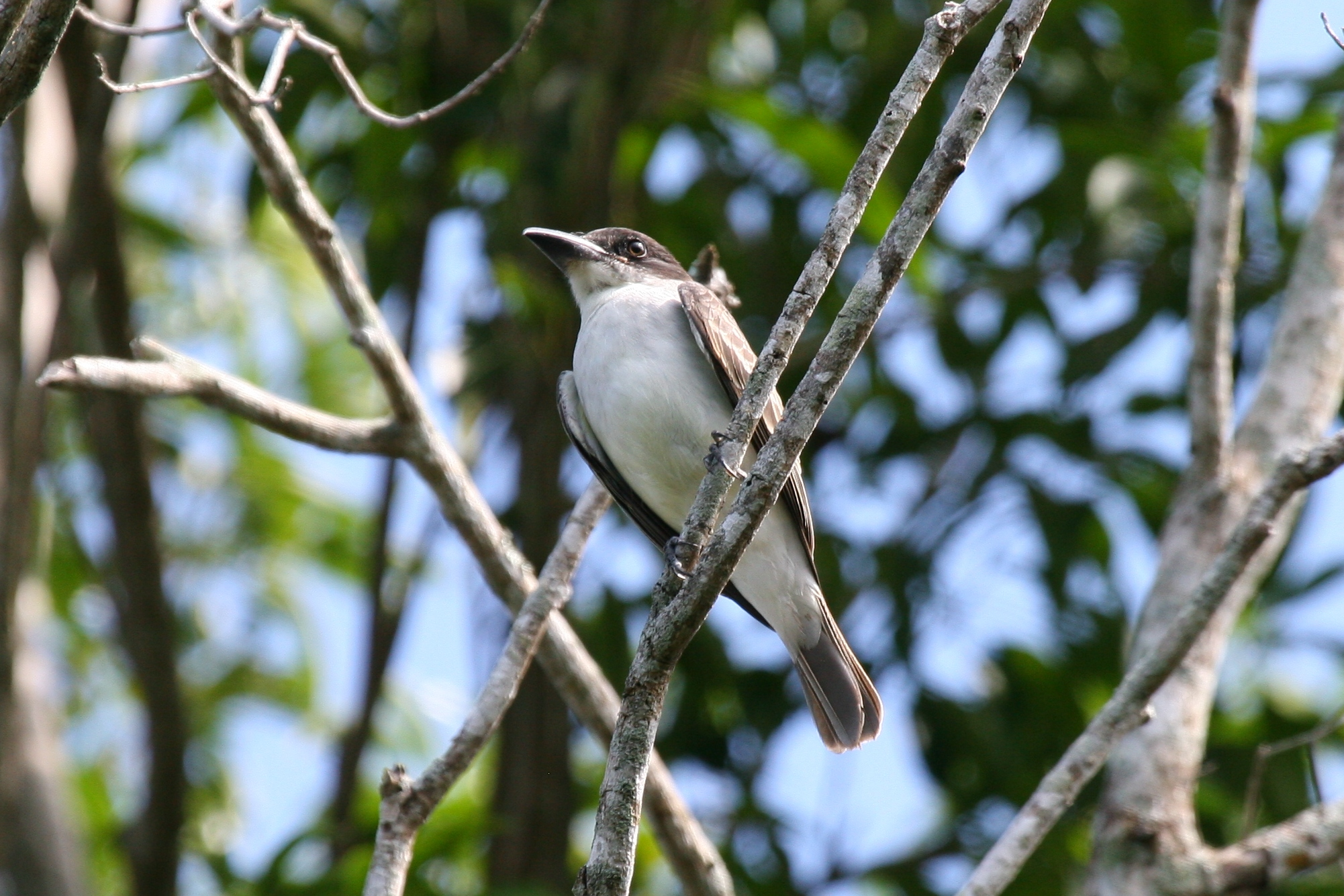

== Description ==
The giant kingbird is the largest member of genus Tyrannus. It is 23 to 26 cm (9.1 to 10 in) long and weighs about 94 g (3.3 oz) with a maximum weight of about 108 g (3.8 oz). It is nearly as heavy as the largest tyrant flycatcher, the great shrike-tyrant (Agriornis lividus). The sexes have the same plumage. Adults have a mostly blackish to black head with white cheeks and a partially hidden deep orange or red patch in the center of the crown. Often they have some white on the lores that extends to the forehead. Their upperparts are medium dark gray to sooty gray. Their wings are mostly medium dark gray to sooty gray with white edges on the median and greater coverts that show as two wing bars. Their remiges are blackish with white edges on the inner secondaries and tertials. Their tail is slightly notched and blackish with white feather tips when fresh. Their chin, throat, and underparts are white with sometimes a light grayish wash on the breast. They have a dark brown iris, a massive black bill with an arched culmen, and blackish legs and feet.

== Distribution and habitat ==
The giant kingbird is found only on Cuba, where it has a highly disjunct distribution. There it is found along the northwestern coast, the southeastern coast, a few locations in the interior, and on Isla de la Juventud (the "Isle of Pines"). It formerly was found on Great Inagua and the Caicos Islands where it was last documented in 1891. There are also Pleistocene fossils from islands in the northern Bahamas. It has been documented as a vagrant in Mexico and possibly in Haiti, where its origin is uncertain. There are also undocumented sight records in Florida.

The giant kingbird primarily inhabits tall forest and the borders of rivers and swamps in the lowlands. It also occurs in pine and mixed pine-deciduous woodlands and open swamps and dry savanna with scattered tall trees. In some areas it occurs in groves of palms interspersed with coffee and cacao plantations. In all areas it appears to require a canopy height of at least 13 m (45 ft). In elevation it ranges from sea level to 1,100 m (3,600 ft).

== Behavior ==
=== Movement ===
The giant kingbird is a sedentary year-round resident.

=== Feeding ===
The giant kingbird feeds primarily on large insects and also includes small vertebrates and fruit in its diet. It usually forages singly or in pairs, perching on an exposed branch in a tall tree. It usually captures insects in mid-air and possibly gleans them during a sally from the perch. It usually takes fruit while briefly hovering.

=== Breeding ===
The giant kingbird is very territorial and defends its patch against other giant kingbirds and other birds as large as Cuban crows (Corvus nasicus) and American kestrels (Falco sparverius). It appears to be monogamous and pairs appear to form year-long bonds. It breeds between March and June. Its nest is an unlined cup made from small twigs, roots, and dried grass and is typically placed in a branch fork between about 13 and 22 m (45 and 70 ft) above the ground. The usual clutch is two or three eggs that are creamy white with reddish, lilac, and gray speckles and spots. The incubation period is 17 to 18 days and the female alone is believed to incubate. The time to fledging and other details of parental care are not known.

=== Vocalization ===
The giant kingbird's principal vocalization is "a loud, burry tooe-tooe-tooee-tooee-tooee chatter". It also makes a four-syllable call, and pairs sometimes sing in duet.

== Status ==
The IUCN originally in 1988 assessed the giant kingbird as being of Least Concern but since 1994 has assessed it as Endangered. It has a "severely fragmented" population estimated at 250 to 1000 mature individuals that is believed to be decreasing. "The precise reasons for this species's decline are unclear, but habitat loss, and especially loss of large trees suitable for nesting, from logging and agricultural conversion may at least a contributory factor. The species has however, been shown to strongly utilise forest gaps and disturbed edges, hence potentially offsetting some of the impacts of ongoing habitat loss." It does occur in four protected areas, and "recent records of new localities indicate that the species might have a wider distribution across the island than previously thought".
