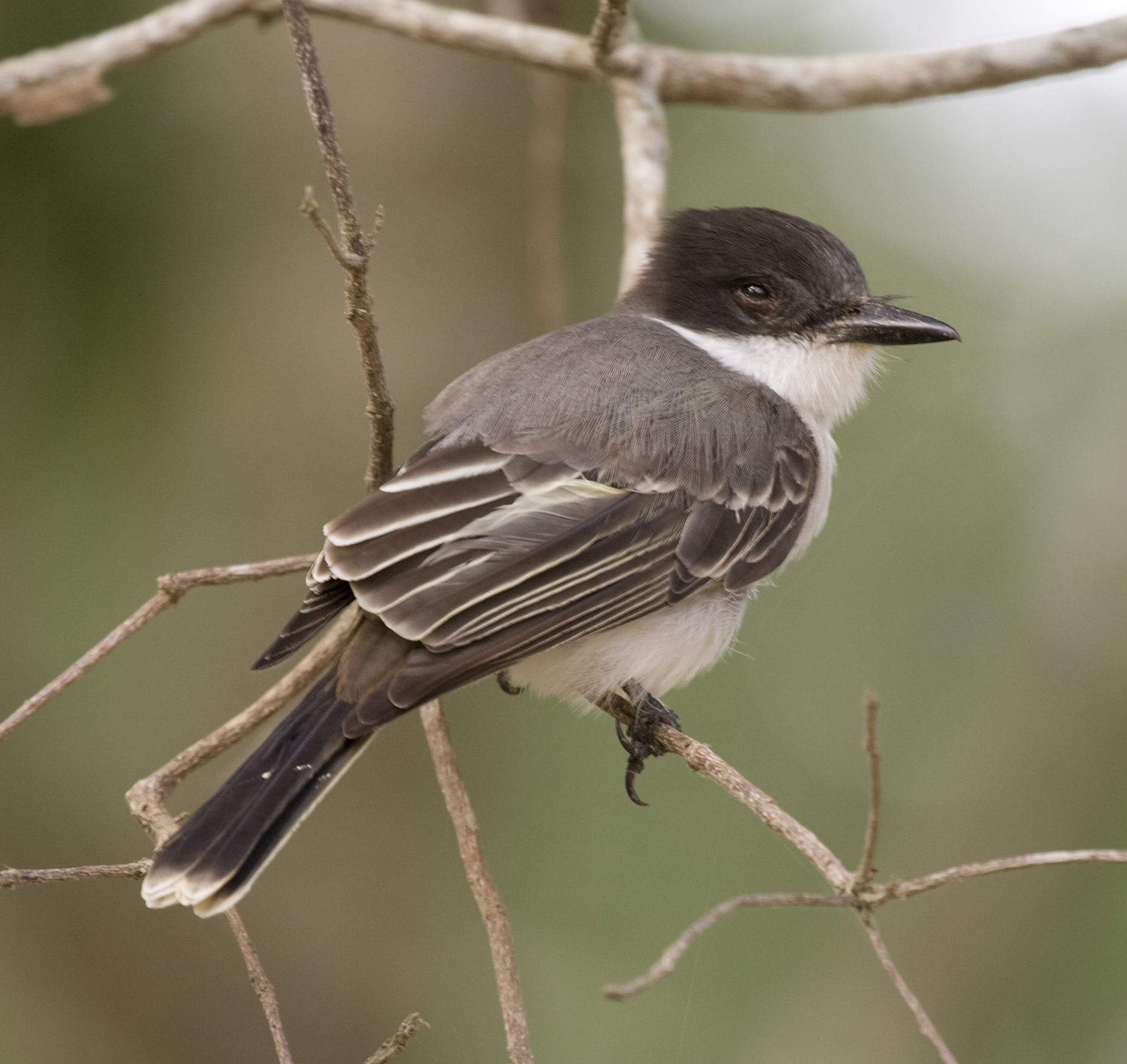
- In Camagüey Province, Cuba

Conservation status
- Least Concern (IUCN 3.1)

Scientific classification
- Kingdom: Animalia
- Phylum: Chordata
- Class: Aves
- Order: Passeriformes
- Family: Tyrannidae
- Genus: Tyrannus
- Species: T. caudifasciatus

Binomial name
- Tyrannus caudifasciatus d'Orbigny, 1839

= Loggerhead kingbird =

Species of bird

The loggerhead kingbird (Tyrannus caudifasciatus) is a species of sub-oscine passerine bird belonging to the family Tyrannidae, the tyrant flycatchers. This species is found in wooded habitats in the islands of the northern Caribbean, with records of vagrants from Florida.

== Taxonomy ==
The loggerhead kingbird was first formally described in 1839 by the French naturalist Alcide d'Orbigny with its type locality given as Cuba. This species is classified within the genus Tyrannus within the family Tyrannidae, the tyrant or New World flycatchers. The Tyrannidae are placed within the parvorder Tyrannides within the order Passeriformes, the perching birds.

=== Subspecies ===
The loggerhead kingbird is subdivided into the following subspecies:

- T. c. caudifasciatus D'Orbigny, 1839 - Cuba
- T. c. flavescens Parkes, 1963 - Isle of Pines
- T. c. bahamensis Bryant, 1864 - Grand Bahama, Abaco, Andros and New Providence islands
- T. c. caymanensis Nicoll, 1904 - Cayman Islands
- T. c. jamaicensis Chapman, 1892 - Jamaica
- T. c. taylori Sclater, 1864 - Puerto Rico and Vieques I.
- T. c. gabbii Lawrence, 1876 - Hispaniola

The Puerto Rican subspecies, T. c. taylori, has been proposed as a separate species, the Puerto Rican kingbird (T. taylori).

== Description ==
The loggerhead kingbird has a length of 24 to 26 cm (9.4 to 10.2 in), and is a large species of kingbird with a heavy bill. It is two-toned dark upper parts and lighter underparts. The head, apart from the throat, is black with an orange patch on the topmost part of the crown which is rarely seen. The upperparts are gray and the underparts are lighter in color. In most populations there is a grayish band at the end of the tail, although this can be white.

== Distribution and habitat ==
The loggerhead kingbird is found in throughout the northern West Indies, in the Bahamas, Cayman Islands, Cuba, Isla de la Juventud, Hispaniola (the Dominican Republic and Haiti), Jamaica and Puerto Rico. It very rarely occurs in southern Florida as a vagrant. Its natural habitats are woodlands, pine and broad-leafed forest, shade coffee palntations, mangroves and open park-like habitats. It can be found from the coast to into the lower parts of mountainous areas.

== Biology ==
The loggerhead kingbird feeds on flying insects, small fruit and berries, and small lizards. It is frequently observed hunting from exposed perches. In Puerto Rico this species builds a cup shaped nest, fabricated from twigs, stems and grass. The pair vocalize constantly during courtship, making rattling and other loud calls, persistently chasing one another. Both male and female choose the nest site and once the selection has been made then the pair make low glides over the site before the female perches on the site. When she perches she flattens herself against the supporting branch, turning in a circle while vocalising and fluttering her wings while the males joins in the vocalizing and erects his normally concealed. brightly colored crown feathers. On Puerto Rico breeding is mainly observed between February and July but nest building can begin in November. The clutch size is 2–4 eggs, except Jamaica where 4–5 eggs was the average. The adults are very aggressive towards other birds invading their territories and this may be why shiny cowbird (molothurus bonairensis) nest parasitism was not recorded for this species. It is a sedentary species, unlike the related gray kingbird (T. dominicensis) and it will move into the preferred habitat of the gray kingbird when the latter migrates away from the islands in winter.

== Gallery ==
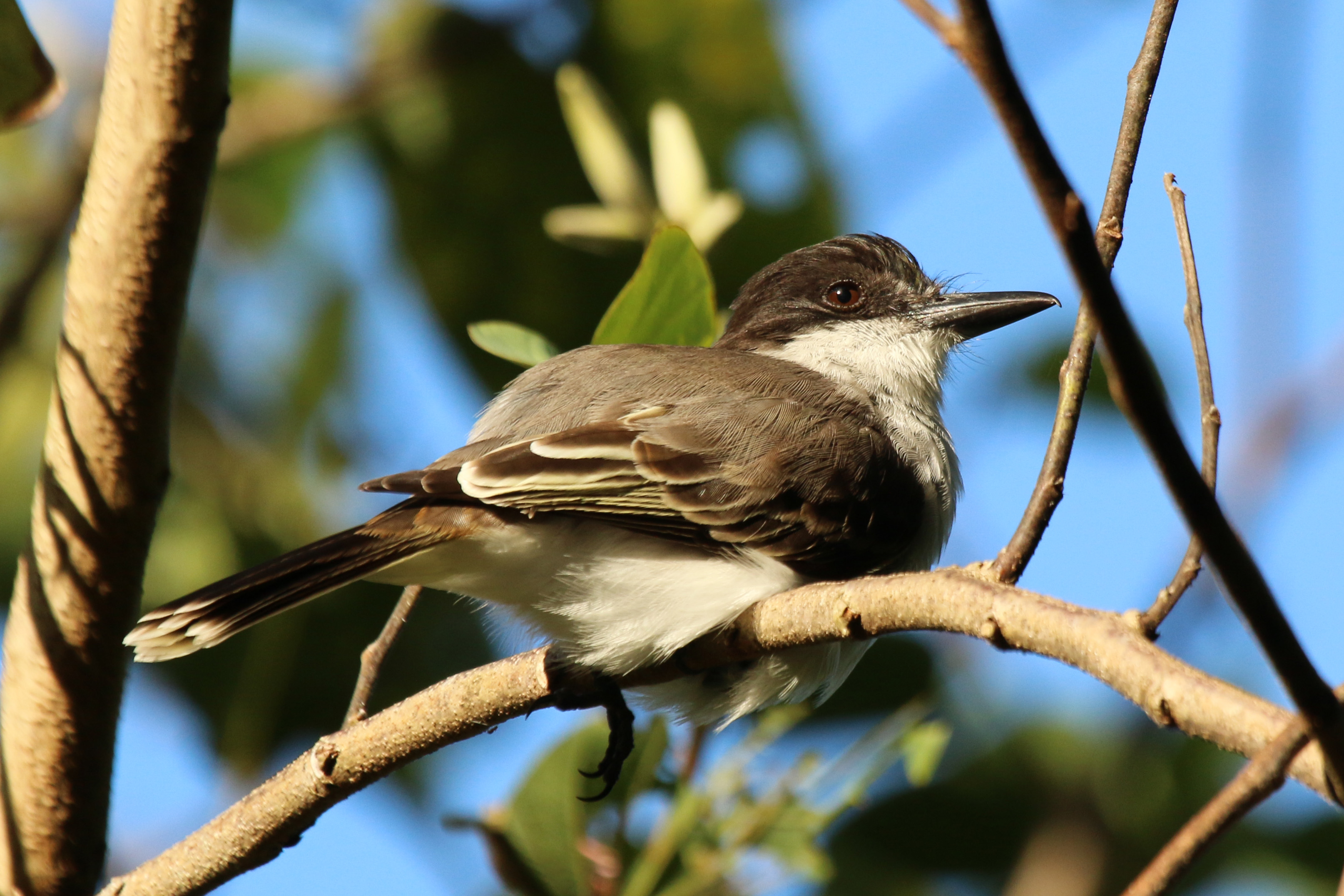
In Jamaica

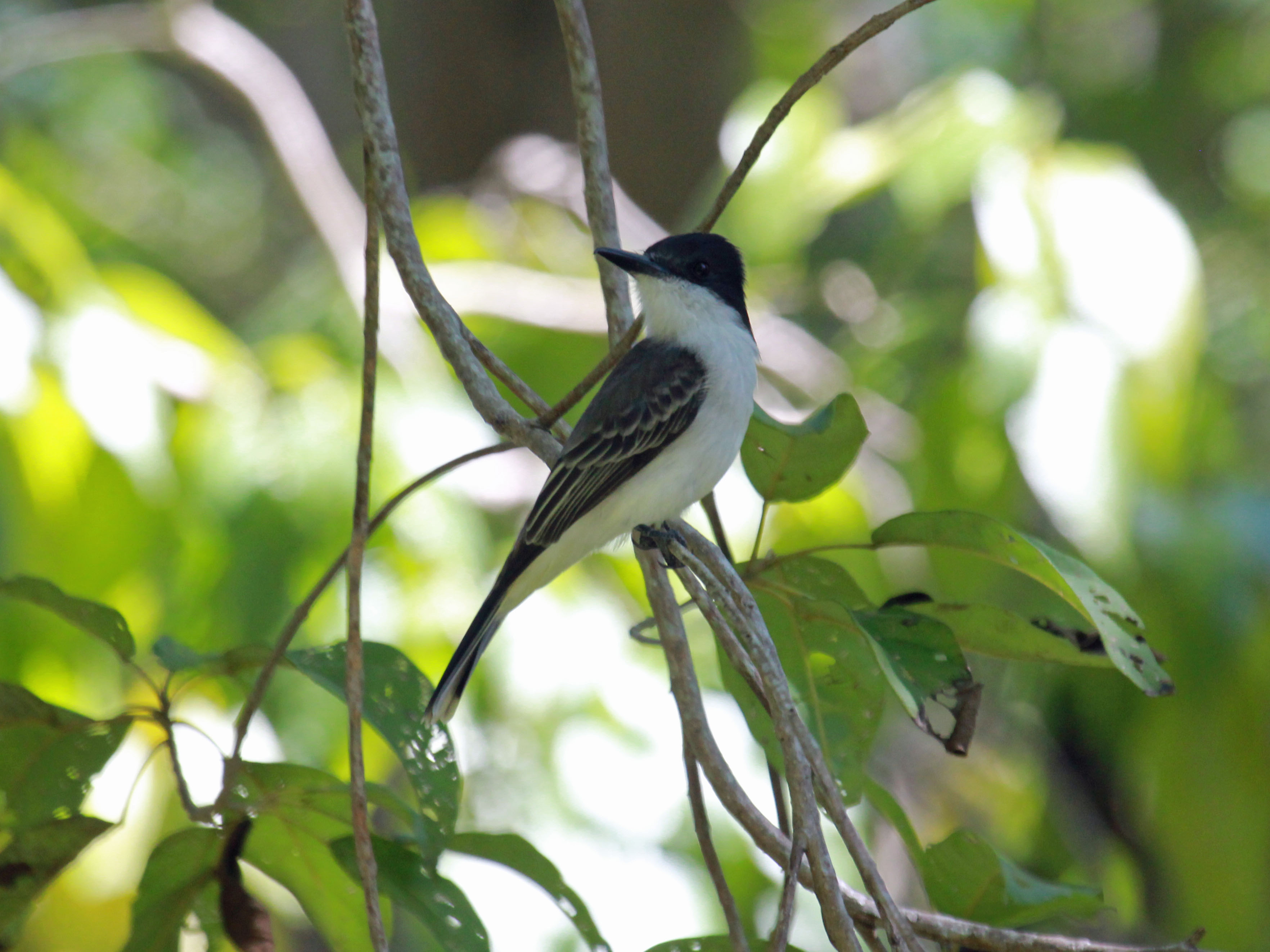
In Jamaica

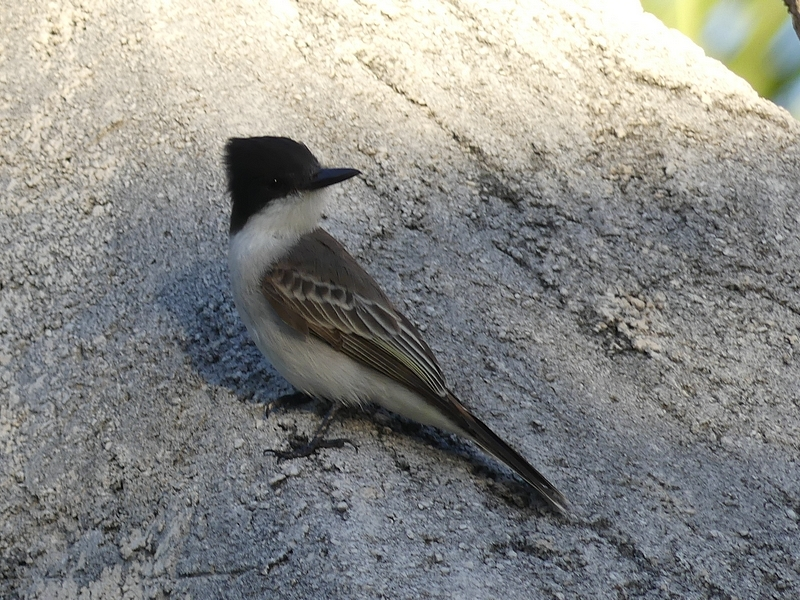
In Cuba
