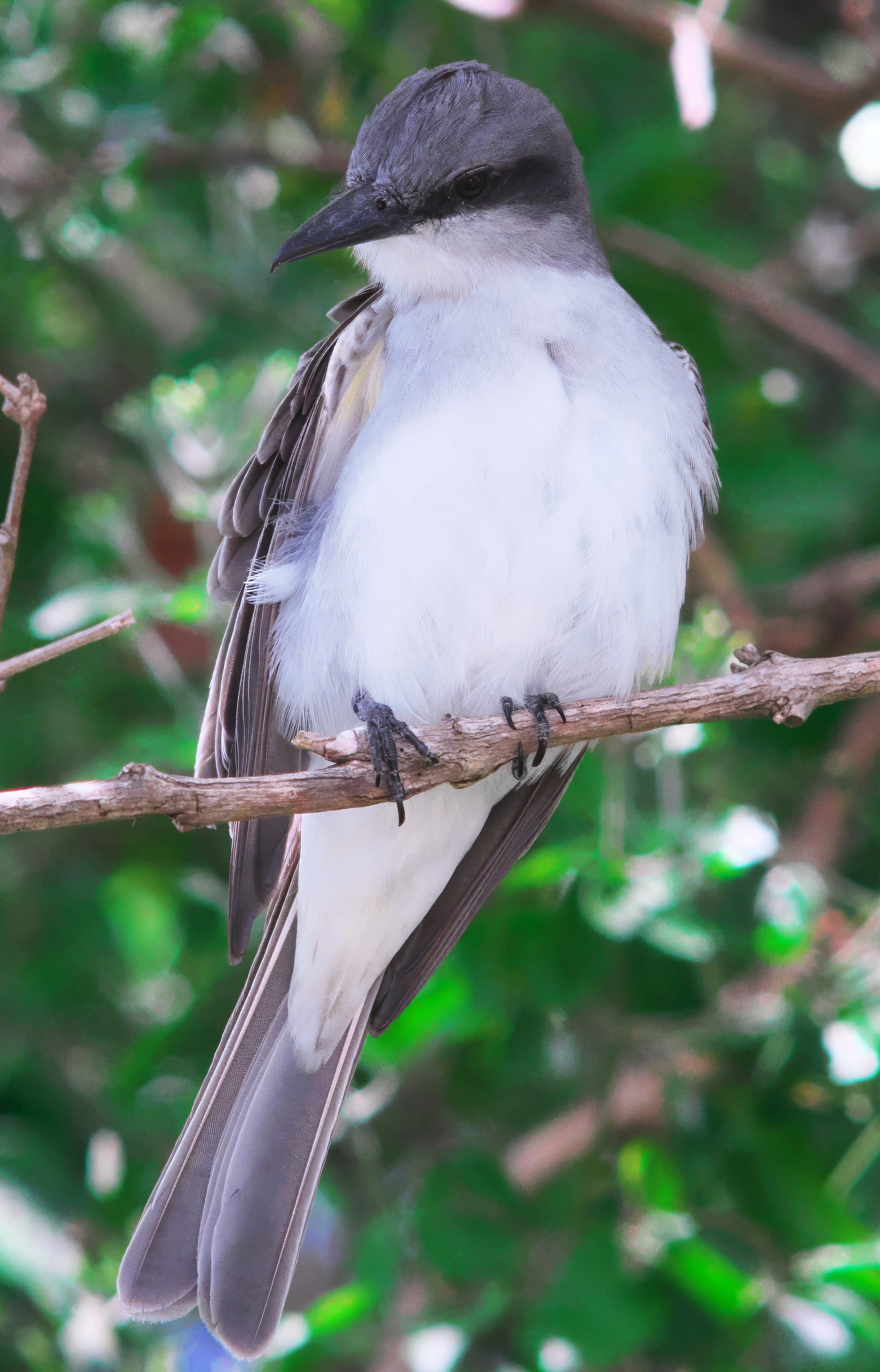

Conservation status
- Least Concern (IUCN 3.1)

Scientific classification
- Kingdom: Animalia
- Phylum: Chordata
- Class: Aves
- Order: Passeriformes
- Family: Tyrannidae
- Genus: Tyrannus
- Species: T. dominicensis

Binomial name
- Tyrannus dominicensis (Gmelin, JF, 1788)
- Breeding Year-round Migration Nonbreeding

= Gray kingbird =

Species of bird

The gray kingbird or grey kingbird (Tyrannus dominicensis), also known as pitirre, petchary or white-breasted kingbird, is a passerine bird in the tyrant flycatchers family Tyrannidae. The species was first described on the island of Hispaniola, then called Santo Domingo, thus the dominicensis name.

== Taxonomy ==
The gray kingbird was formally described in 1788 by the German naturalist Johann Friedrich Gmelin in his revised and expanded edition of Carl Linnaeus's Systema Naturae. He placed it with the shrikes in the genus Lanius and coined the binomial name Lanius dominicensis. The specific epithet is from the locality Santo Domingo, now Hispaniola. Gmelin based his description on "Le tyran de S. Domingue" that had been described and illustrated in 1760 by the French zoologist Mathurin Jacques Brisson. The gray kingbird is now one of 13 species placed in the kingbird genus Tyrannus that was introduced in 1799 by the French naturalist Bernard Germain de Lacépède. A molecular genetic study published in 2020 found that the gray kingbird was sister to the giant kingbird (Tyrannus cubensis).

Two subspecies are recognised:

- T. d. dominicensis (Gmelin, JF, 1788) – southeast USA to Colombia and Venezuela
- T. d. vorax Vieillot, 1819 – Lesser Antilles

== Description ==
The adult gray kingbird is an average-sized kingbird. It measures 23 cm (9.1 in) in length and weighs from 37 to 52 g (1.3 to 1.8 oz). The upperparts are gray, with brownish wings and tail, and the underparts are white with a gray tinge to the chest. The head has a concealed yellow crown stripe, and a dusky mask through the eyes. The dark bill is heavier than that of the related, slightly smaller, tropical kingbird. The sexes are similar, but young birds have rufous edges on the wing coverts, rump and tail.

The call is a loud rolling trill, pipiri, pipiri, which is the reason behind many of its local onomatopoeiac names, like pestigre or pitirre, in the Spanish-speaking Greater Antilles, or petchary in some of the English-speaking islands.

== Distribution and habitat ==
It is found in increasing numbers in the state of Florida, and is more often found inland though it had been previously restricted to the coast. It breeds from the extreme southeast of the United States, mainly in Florida, as well as Central America, and through the West Indies south to Venezuela, Trinidad and Tobago, the Guianas, and Colombia. Northern populations are migratory, wintering on the Caribbean coast of Central America and northern South America. Several vagrant populations are known to exist in the Northeastern United States. It favors tall trees and shrubs, including the edges of savanna and marshes.

== Behavior ==
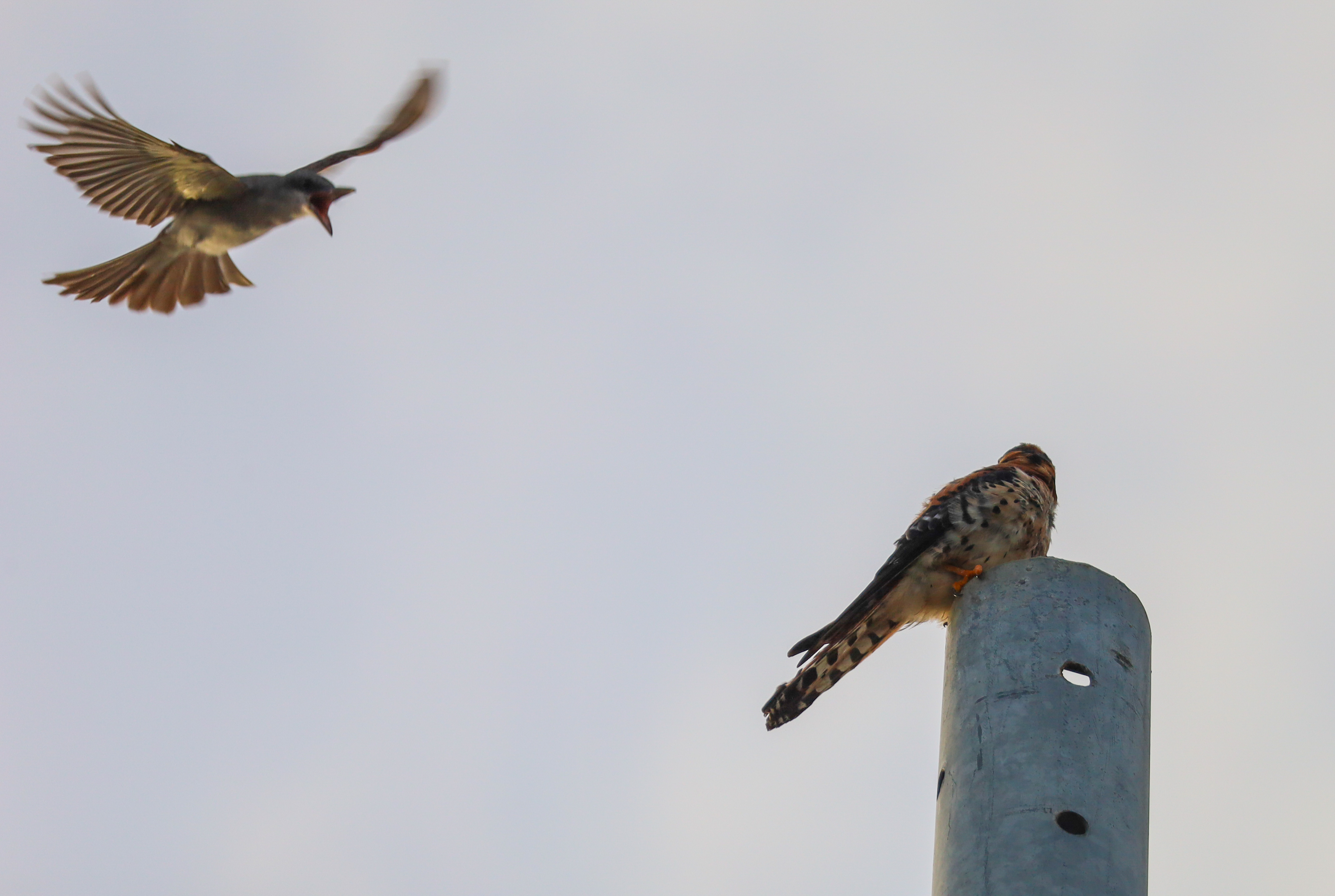
Gray kingbirds mobbing an American kestrel in Puerto Rico.

Like other kingbirds, these birds aggressively defend their territory against intruders, including mammals and much larger birds such as crested caracaras, red-tailed hawks and broad-winged hawks by mobbing.

=== Food and feeding ===
Gray kingbirds wait on an exposed perch high in a tree, occasionally sallying out to feed on insects (such as bees, dragonflies, wasps and beetles), their staple diet. They also eat small fruits and berries depending on its availability. Fruits and berries make up one fifth of their daily diet. Spiders and small lizards are occasionally eaten.

=== Breeding ===
It makes a flimsy cup nest in a tree. The female incubates the typical clutch of two cream eggs, which are marked with reddish brown.

== Gallery ==
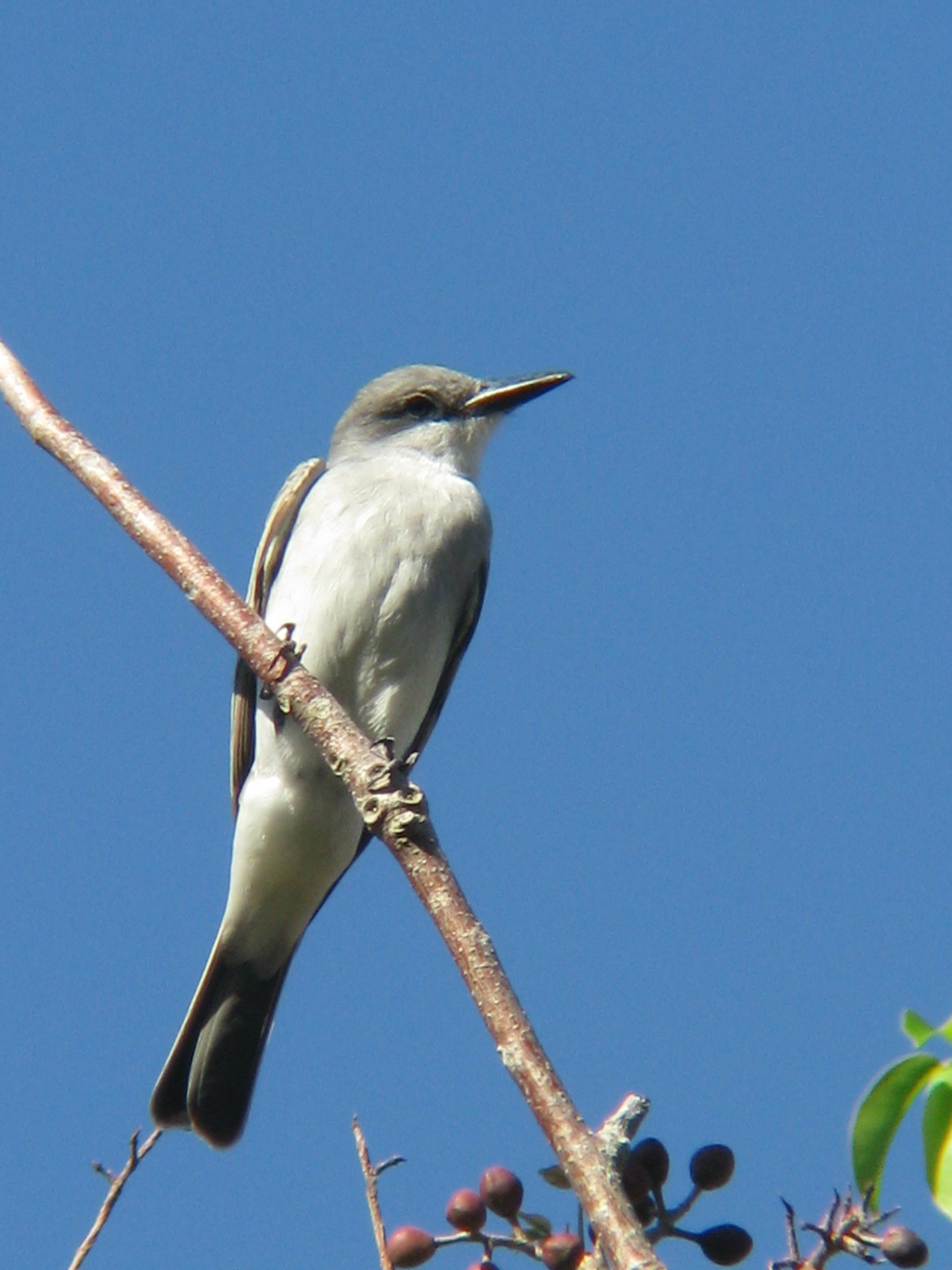

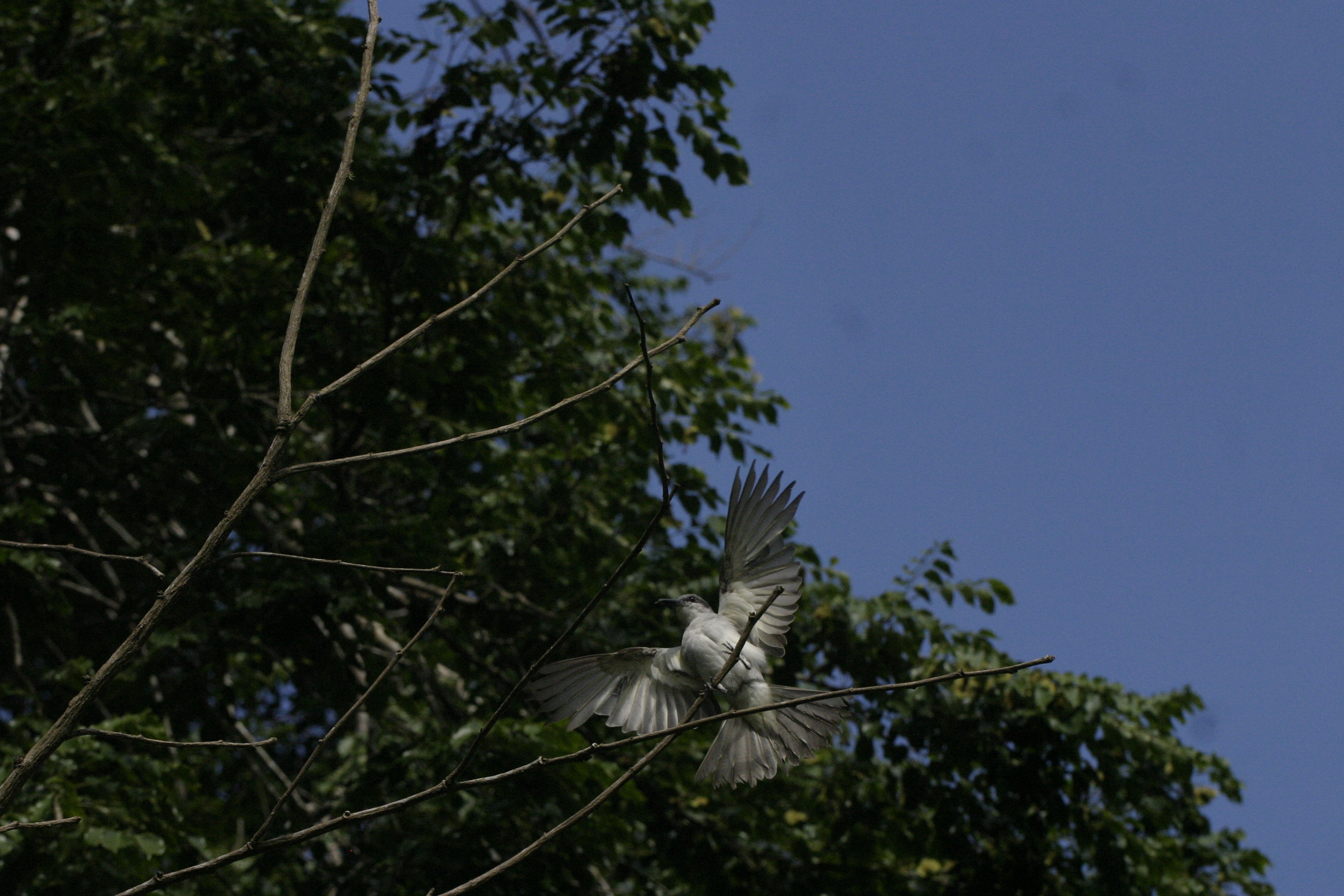

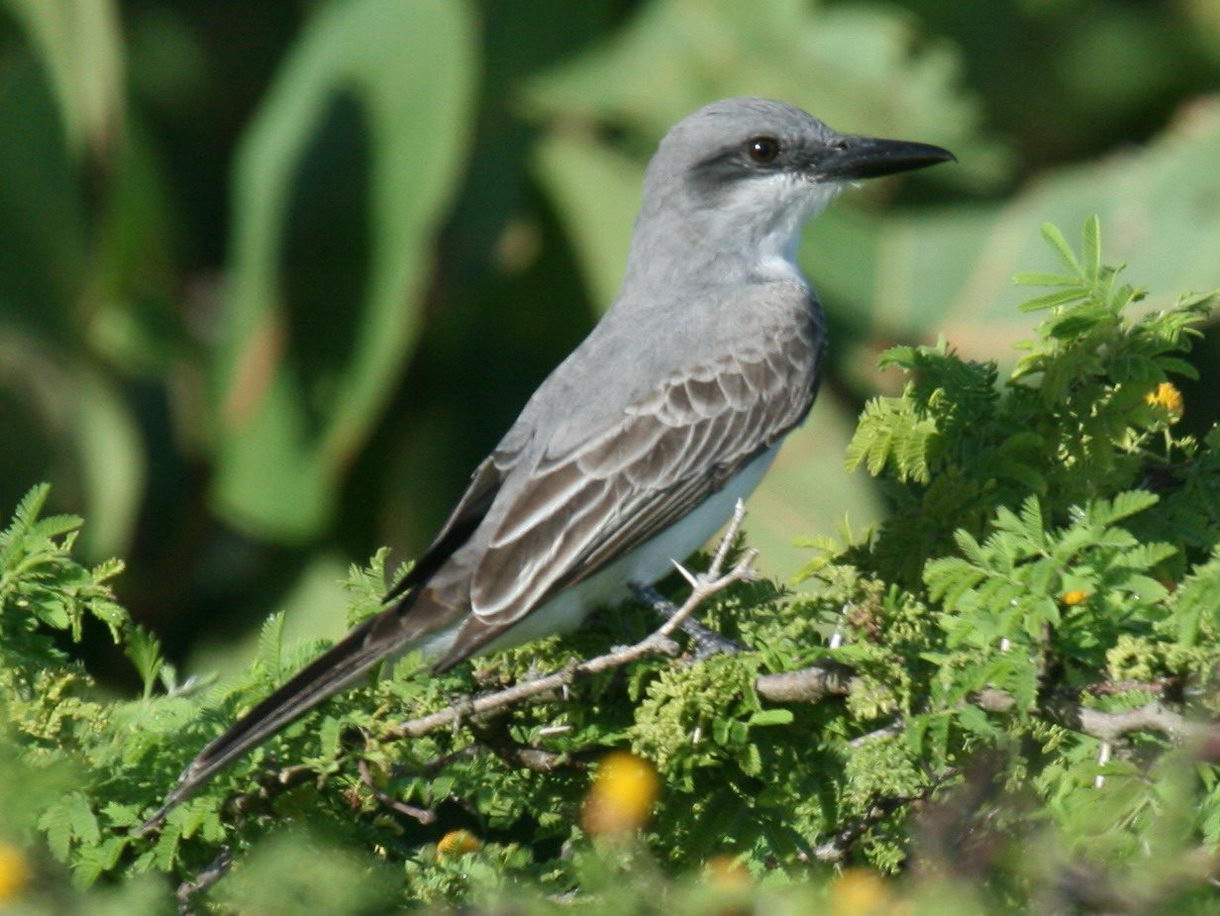

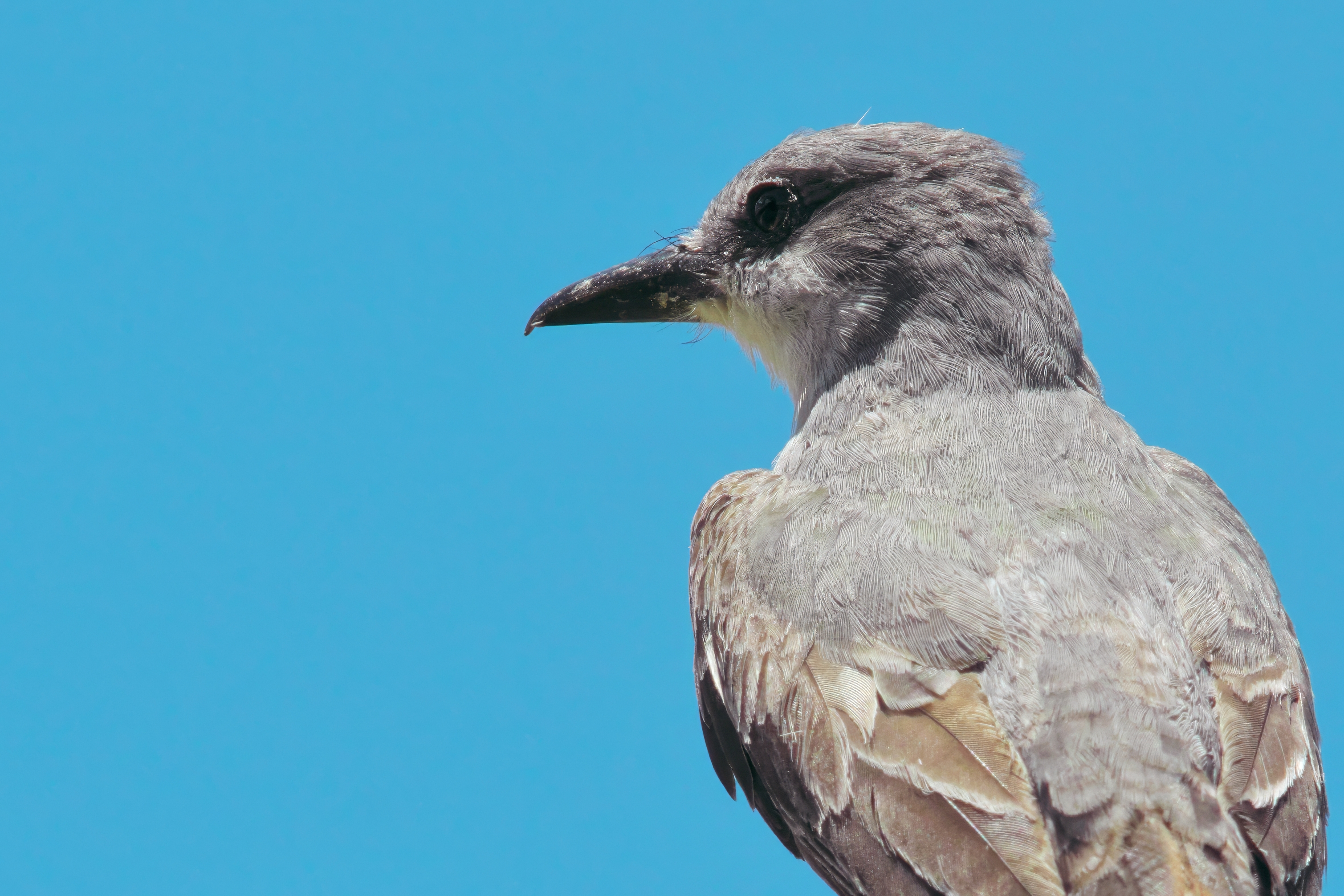
