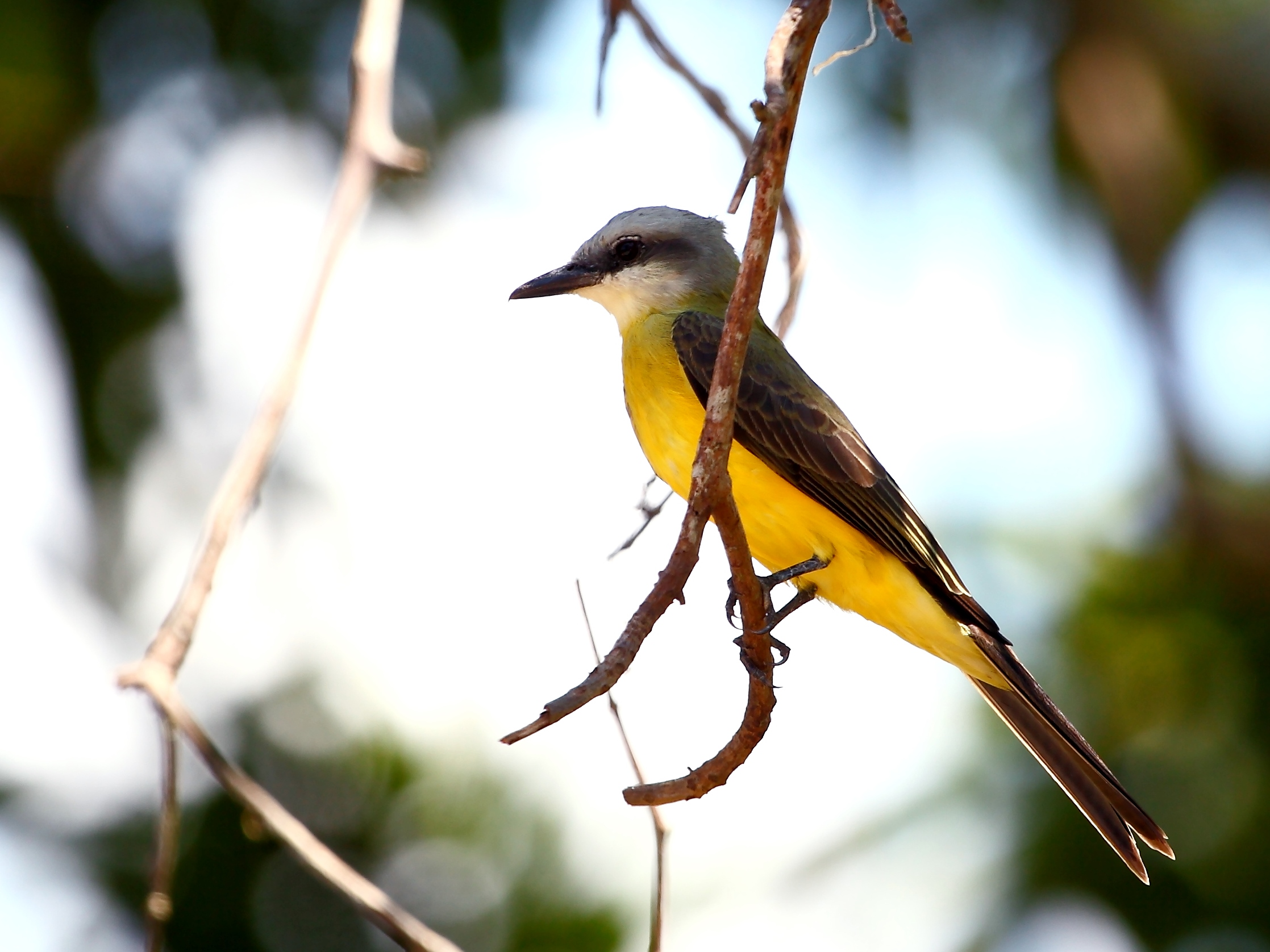

Conservation status
- Least Concern (IUCN 3.1)

Scientific classification
- Kingdom: Animalia
- Phylum: Chordata
- Class: Aves
- Order: Passeriformes
- Family: Tyrannidae
- Genus: Tyrannus
- Species: T. albogularis

Binomial name
- Tyrannus albogularis Burmeister, 1856
- Year-round Non-Breeding The ranges shown are not accurate; see the Distribution and Movement sections for details.

= White-throated kingbird =

Species of bird

The white-throated kingbird (Tyrannus albogularis) is a species of bird in the family Tyrannidae, the tyrant flycatchers. It is found in Bolivia, Brazil, Ecuador, Guyana, Peru, Suriname, and Venezuela, in French Guiana as a vagrant, and possibly in Argentina and Colombia.

== Taxonomy and systematics ==
The white-throated kingbird is monotypic.

== Description ==
The white-throated kingbird is 20 to 21 cm (7.9 to 8.3 in) long and weighs 35 to 38 g (1.2 to 1.3 oz). The sexes have the same plumage. Adults have a mostly pale gray head with a partially hidden pale orange or yellowish patch in the center of the crown. They have a dusky band from the lores to the ear coverts that forms a "mask". Their upperparts are mostly bright olive green. Their wings are dull blackish brown with pale edges on the coverts and secondaries. Their tail is black and notched. Their throat is white and their underparts bright yellow with a very faint tinge of olive on the breast. They have a dark iris, a stout dark bill, and blackish legs and feet.

== Distribution and habitat ==
The white-throated kingbird's full range has not been firmly established. It is definitely found from eastern Ecuador and eastern Peru east through northern Bolivia, southern Venezuela, and Guyana and Suriname into much of Brazil. In Brazil its range's eastern edge roughly extends from Amapá south through Pará, Tocantins, and western Bahia and Minas Gerais into Mato Grosso do Sul and São Paulo. McMullan's field guide to Colombia includes the species; the South American Classification Committee of the American Ornithological Society (SACC) has no confirmed records there and so classes it as hypothetical. The SACC also classes it as hypothetical in Argentina and as a vagrant in French Guiana.

The white-throated kingbird inhabits a variety of lowland tropical landscapes, most of which are fairly open and shrubby. These include cerrado, savannah, the edges of gallery forest, and stands of moriche and sometimes other palms. In all cases it is usually found near water. During the non-breeding season it appears to use other habitats as well including suburban and urban areas, but still tends to be near water. In elevation it ranges in Brazil from sea level to 1,000 m (3,300 ft). In Ecuador the few records are below 300 m (1,000 ft). There are sight records in Venezuela as high as 900 m (3,000 ft).

== Behavior ==
=== Movement ===
The white-throated kingbird is a partial migrant, though the exact boundaries of its breeding, non-breeding, and year-round ranges are not fully defined. According to van Perlo's field guide its breeding range is almost entirely in Brazil and extents somewhat into eastern Bolivia. In Brazil its northern edge roughly crosses central Rondônia, southeastern Amazonas, and central Pará to the Atlantic coast. The breeding range extends south to Mato Grosso do Sul and São Paulo. It is a year-round resident in Brazil north of the breeding range and east of Roraima and in Guyana and Suriname. Hilty's Venezuelan field guide states that it is "almost certainly a [year]-round resident and presumed breeder" in far southeastern Bolívar state. In the austral winter it moves from the breeding range north into the year-round range and west into northwestern Brazil, eastern Peru, eastern Ecuador, southern Venezuela, and possibly extreme southern Colombia. It has occurred as a vagrant in French Guiana, possibly when overshooting during its north-bound migration.

=== Feeding ===
The white-throated kingbird feeds on insects, taking them in mid-air with sallies from a perch that is typically about 3 or 4 m (10 or 13 ft) above the ground.

=== Breeding ===
The white-throated kingbird's breeding season is approximately September to April. It is thought to build a cup nest like others of its genus. Nothing else is known about the species' breeding biology.

=== Vocalization ===
The white-throated kingbird is not very vocal. Its typical call is "a shrill, trilled tic tic tic'i'i'i'i'i'i'i'i'i'i'i". It also occasionally makes a "long and irregular series of tic notes and trills" that may continue for several minutes.

== Status ==
The IUCN has assessed the white-throated kingbird as being of Least Concern. It has a large range; its population size is not known but is believed to be stable. No immediate threats have been identified. In Brazil it is considered uncommon to frequent in its breeding and year-round ranges and common in its non-breeding range. It is considered rare in Colombia, very rare in Ecuador, uncommon in Peru, and local in Venezuela. It occurs in many protected areas both public and private. "Given its tolerance of converted habitat and its large range, this species does not appear to be at any risk; nevertheless, further study is needed in order to determine its precise ecological and breeding requirements."
