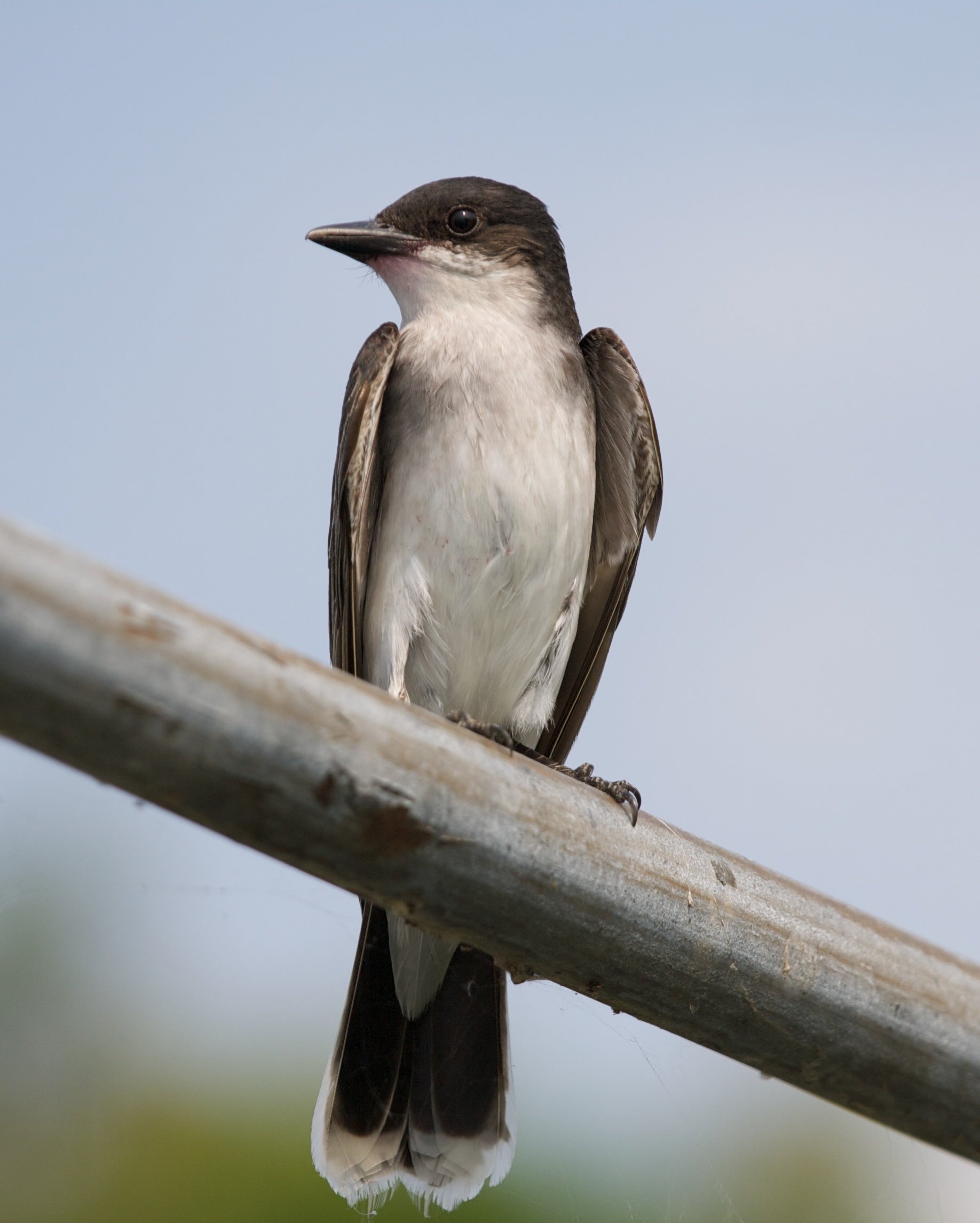
- Eastern kingbird (Tyrannus tyrannus)

Scientific classification
- Kingdom: Animalia
- Phylum: Chordata
- Class: Aves
- Order: Passeriformes
- Family: Tyrannidae
- Genus: Tyrannus; Lacépède, 1799

Type species
- Tyrannus tyrannus Linnaeus, 1758

Species
- See text.

= Kingbird =

Kingbirds

Genus of birds

Tyrannus is a genus of small passerine birds in the tyrant flycatcher family Tyrannidae that are native to the Americas. The majority are named as kingbirds.

== Description ==
They prefer semi-open or open areas. These birds wait on an exposed perch and then catch insects in flight. They have long pointed wings and large broad bills. These birds tend to defend their breeding territories aggressively, often chasing away much larger birds. A kingbird was photographed in 2009 defending its young by landing on and sinking its talons into the back of a red-tailed hawk and pecking its skull until the red-tailed hawk gave up and flew away.

== Taxonomy ==
The genus was introduced in 1799 by the French naturalist Bernard Germain de Lacépède with the eastern kingbird (Tyrannus tyrannus) as the type species. The genus name is the Latin word for 'tyrant' and is motivated by the kingbirds' abovementioned tendency to aggressively chase away any other birds regardless of their size.

=== Species ===
The genus contains 13 species:

Image	Common name	Scientific name	Distribution
	Snowy-throated kingbird	Tyrannus niveigularis	Colombia, Ecuador, and Peru
	White-throated kingbird	Tyrannus albogularis	Bolivia, Brazil, Colombia, Ecuador, Peru, and Venezuela, and in the Guianas of Guyana, Suriname and French Guiana
	Tropical kingbird	Tyrannus melancholicus	Southern Arizona and the lower Rio Grande Valley of Texas in the United States through Central America, South America as far south as central Argentina and western Peru, and on Trinidad and Tobago
	Couch's kingbird	Tyrannus couchii	Central and southern Texas along the Gulf Coast to the Yucatán Peninsula in Mexico, Belize and northern Guatemala.
	Cassin's kingbird	Tyrannus vociferans	California and from Montana to Utah, along the eastern Rocky Mountains, and northern Central America
	Thick-billed kingbird	Tyrannus crassirostris	Southeastern Arizona and extreme southwestern New Mexico in the United States and northern Sonora (the Madrean sky islands) through the western and western-coastal ranges in Mexico, south to western Guatemala.
	Western kingbird	Tyrannus verticalis	Western half of the United States and the Pacific coast of southern Mexico and Central America.
	Scissor-tailed flycatcher	Tyrannus forficatus	United States, in Texas, Oklahoma, Kansas, western portions of Louisiana, Arkansas, and Missouri, and far eastern New Mexico; northeastern Mexico
	Fork-tailed flycatcher	Tyrannus savana	Central Mexico to central Argentina
	Eastern kingbird	Tyrannus tyrannus	Open areas across North America
	Gray kingbird	Tyrannus dominicensis	United States (mainly in Florida), through Central America and the Caribbean (from Cuba to Puerto Rico as well as eastward towards all across the Lesser West Indies), south to Venezuela, Trinidad and Tobago, the Guianas, and Colombia.
	Giant kingbird	Tyrannus cubensis	Cuba
	Loggerhead kingbird	Tyrannus caudifasciatus	West Indies: The Bahamas, Cayman Islands, Cuba, Hispaniola (the Dominican Republic and Haiti), Jamaica, Puerto Rico, and, very rarely, Florida in the United States.
