= Snowy Mountain =

Snowy Mountain may refer to:

- Snowy Mountain (Alaska Peninsula), Alaska, United States, a stratovolcano
- Snowy Mountain (New York), United States
- Snowy Mountain Range, another name for the Trans-Mexican Volcanic Belt, central-southern Mexico
- Snowy Mountain Road (County Route 17), Dry Run, West Virginia, United States
- Snowy Mountain Engineering Corporation, an Australian-based consulting firm

== See also ==
- Snowy Range, Wyoming
- Old Snowy Mountain, Washington state
- Xueshan Range, a mountain range in Taiwan (Xueshan translates as "Snowy Mountain")
  - Xueshan, the tallest mountain in the range
- Snowy Mountains, a mountain range
- Big Snowy Mountains, Montana
- Little Snowy Mountains, Montana
- Snowy Top, aka Snowy Top Mountain, Idaho
- Sierra Nevada (disambiguation)
