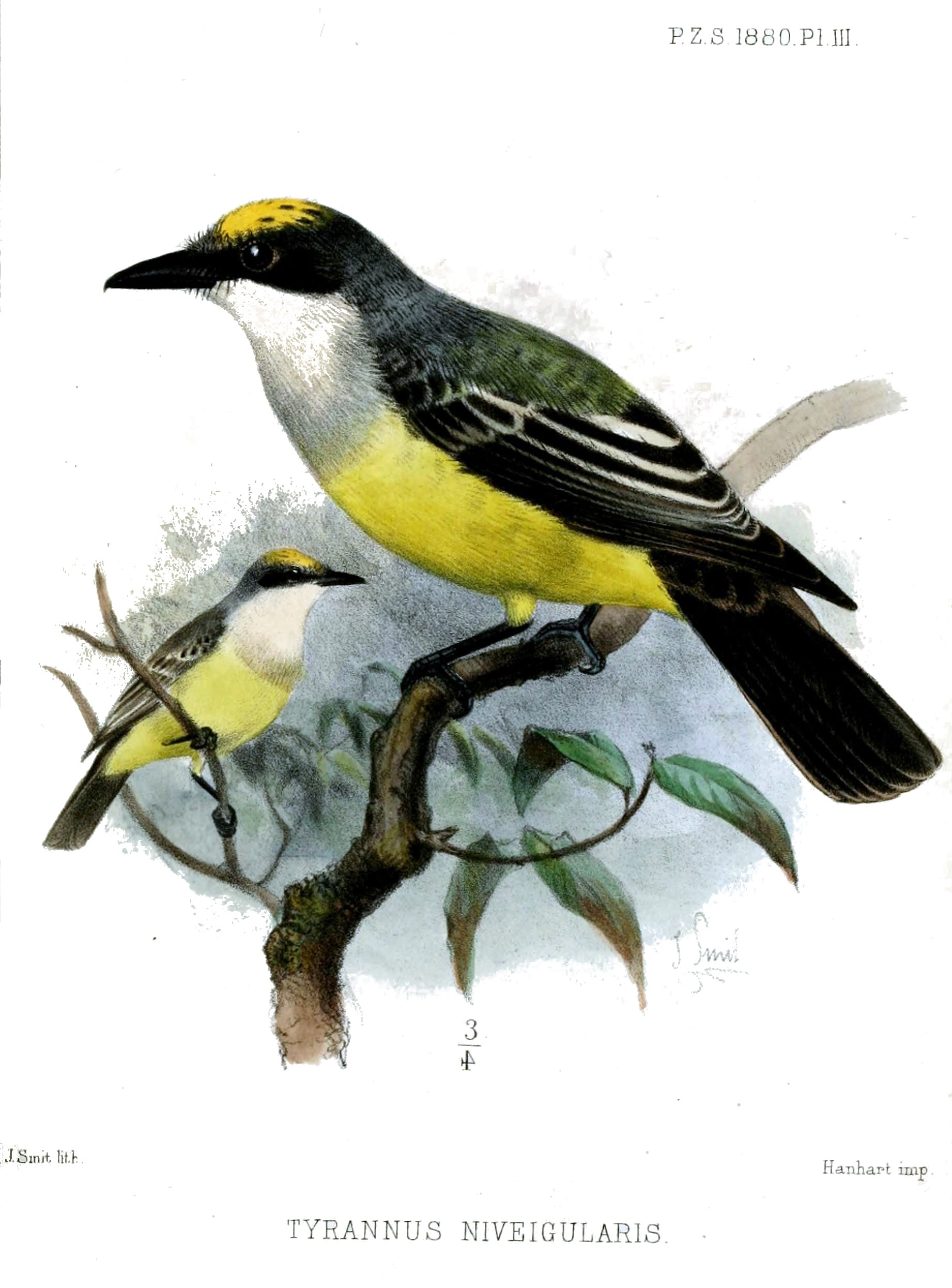

Conservation status
- Least Concern (IUCN 3.1)

Scientific classification
- Kingdom: Animalia
- Phylum: Chordata
- Class: Aves
- Order: Passeriformes
- Family: Tyrannidae
- Genus: Tyrannus
- Species: T. niveigularis

Binomial name
- Tyrannus niveigularis Sclater, PL, 1860
- Non-Breeding Year-round The year-round area shown is incorrect; see the Movement section for details.

= Snowy-throated kingbird =

Species of bird

The snowy-throated kingbird (Tyrannus niveigularis) is a species of bird in the family Tyrannidae, the tyrant flycatchers. It is found in Colombia, Ecuador, and Peru.

== Taxonomy and systematics ==
The snowy-throated kingbird is monotypic.

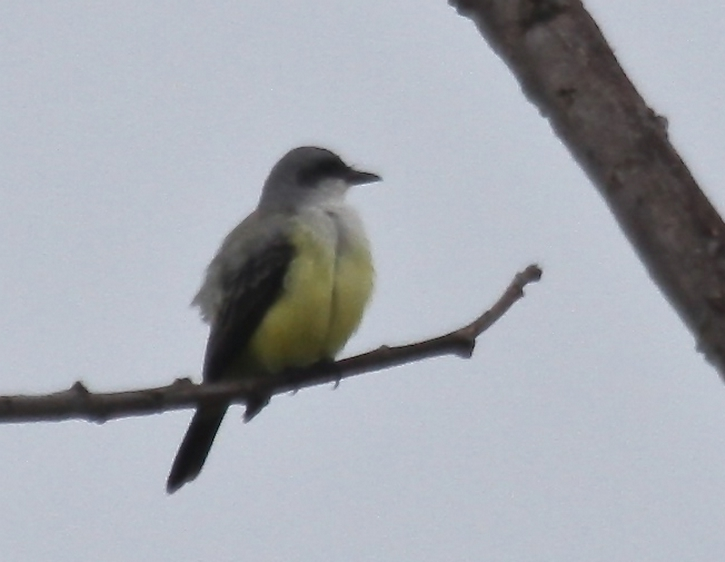
South of Guayaquil, Ecuador

== Description ==
The snowy-throated kingbird is 18.5 to 19 cm (7.3 to 7.5 in) long; one male weighed 34.4 g (1.2 oz). The sexes have the same plumage. Adults have a gray crown and nape with a partially hidden yellow patch in the center of the crown. They have a thin black band on the forecrown and lores that widens into a mask to the ear coverts. Their upperparts are mostly pale gray with more olive on the lower back and rump. Their wings are dusky with whitish edges on the coverts and secondaries. Their tail is blackish with a square tip. Their cheeks and throat are white that darkens to pale gray on the breast. Their belly and undertail coverts are pale yellow. They have a dark iris, a black bill, and black legs and feet.

== Distribution and habitat ==
The snowy-throated kingbird is found west of the Andes from far southwestern Colombia's Nariño Department south through Ecuador into Peru as far as northern La Libertad and southwestern San Martín departments. During the breeding season it inhabits gallery forest, deciduous forest, arid scrublands, secondary forest, and agricultural areas that retain some woodlands. In northern Ecuador and probably Colombia in the non-breeding season it occurs in more humid landscapes. In elevation it is found below 1,500 m (4,900 ft) in Colombia, mostly below 500 m (1,600 ft) in Ecuador, and below 700 m (2,300 ft) in Peru.

== Behavior ==
=== Movement ===
The snowy-throated kingbird is a partial migrant. It usually leaves Peru entirely between July and November "but may stay longer in strong El Niño years". It is a year-round resident in Ecuador from about the Peruvian border north to central Manabí Province though part of that population moves into the rest of northwestern Ecuador for June to November and into extreme southwestern Colombia between March and October.

=== Feeding ===
The snowy-throated kingbird's diet is not known in detail but includes members of the insect families Hymenoptera and Coleoptera and also berries. It typically forages singly or in pairs, taking insects in mid-air and fruit from foliage with sallies from a perch atop a tree or shrub.

=== Breeding ===
The snowy-throated kingbird breeds in Ecuador and Peru in the wet season between December and June. Its nest is a cup made from thin twigs, plant stems, and lichens lined with thin plant fibers, rootlets, and hair. It is typically placed in a small tree or bush, with 31 known nests arrayed between 2.1 and 7.5 m (6.9 and 25 ft) above the ground. The most frequent clutch size is three eggs but two to four are known. The eggs are creamy white with brown or chocolate brown blotches and lavender spots. The incubation period is 15 to 16 days and fledging occurs 14 to 19 days after hatch. Details of parental care are not known.

=== Vocalization ===
The snowy-throated kingbird's dawn song is "a fast and jumbled ki-ki-ki-kr-reé-it!" and its call "a sharp kip! that can be extended into a kip! kr-r-r-ee-ee-ee".

== Status ==
The IUCN has assessed the snowy-throated kingbird as being of Least Concern. It has a large range; its population size is not known but is believed to be stable. No immediate threats have been identified. It is an "uncommon austral migrant" in Colombia, a "fairly common" breeder in Ecuador, and an "uncommon seasonal breeder" in Peru. "Human activity has little short-term direct effect on the Snowy-throated Kingbird, other than the local effects of habitat destruction."
