= Snowy Top =

Mountain in Idaho, United States

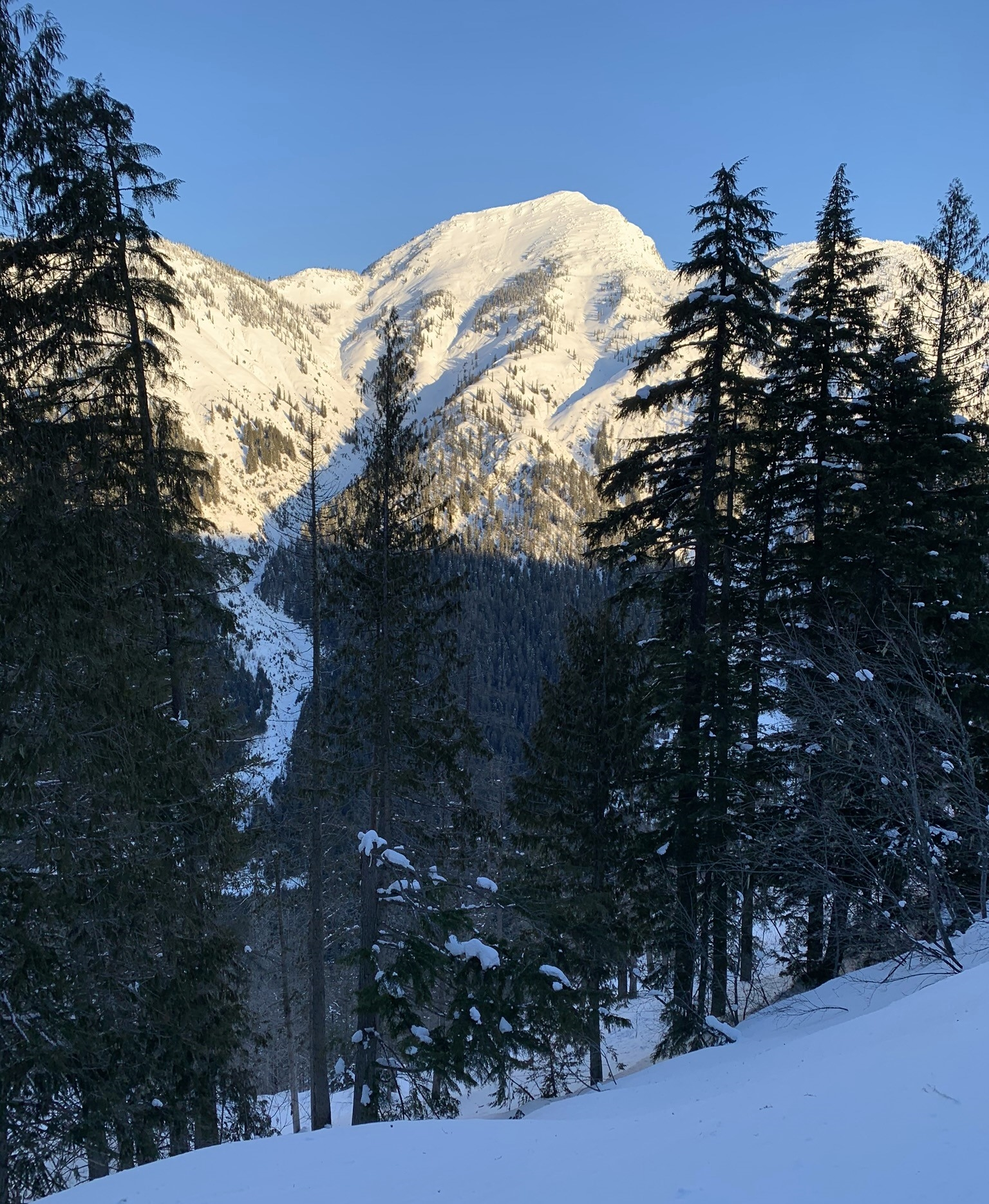
- Southeast aspect

Highest point
- Elevation: 7,572 ft (2,308 m)
- Prominence: 1,765 ft (538 m)
- Parent peak: Ripple Mountain (7,657 ft)
- Isolation: 4.93 mi (7.93 km)
- Coordinates: 48°59′30″N 116°59′11″W

Geography
- Location within Idaho Location within the United States
- Country: United States
- State: Idaho
- County: Boundary
- Protected area: Kaniksu National Forest
- Parent range: Selkirk Mountains
- Topo map: USGS Continental Mountain

Climbing
- Easiest route: class 2

Snowy Top, also known as Snowy Top Mountain, is a 7,572-foot-elevation (2,308 m) mountain summit in Boundary County, Idaho, United States.

== Description ==
Snowy Top is part of the Selkirk Mountains, and the peak ranks as the sixth-highest peak in Boundary County. The mountain is situated one-half mile (0.80 km) south of the Canada–United States border on land managed by Idaho Panhandle National Forests, and the mountain is within the Snowy Top Research Natural Area. Precipitation runoff from the mountain's western slope drains to the South Salmo River, whereas the other slopes drain to the Upper Priest River, and both rivers are part of the Columbia River drainage basin. Topographic relief is significant as the summit rises 2,370 feet (722 meters) above Nun Creek in one-half mile (0.80 km) and 4,570 feet (1,393 meters) above the Upper Priest River in 1.7 miles (2.7 km). This mountain's toponym was officially adopted in 1970 by the United States Board on Geographic Names.

== Climate ==
Based on the Köppen climate classification, Snowy Top is located in an alpine subarctic climate zone with long, cold, snowy winters, and cool to warm summers. Winter temperatures can drop below 0 °F with wind chill factors below −10 °F.

== See also ==
- List of mountain peaks of Idaho
