= Snow Creek (Missouri) =

Stream in Wayne County, Missouri, U.S.

Coordinates: 36°57′59″N 90°21′09″W

Snow Creek is a stream in Wayne County in the U.S. state of Missouri. It is a tributary of the St. Francis River within Lake Wappapello.

Snow Creek most likely has the name of a pioneer citizen.

== See also ==
- List of rivers of Missouri
