= Snowy River (disambiguation) =

Snowy River may refer to:

- Snowy River, a major river in south-east Australia
  - Snowy River National Park, a national park in Australia, located adjacent to portions of the Snowy River
  - Snowy River Shire, a local government area in Australia
- Snowy River (Tasmania), a tributary of North Esk River in Australia
- Snowy River (New Zealand), a river on the west coast of New Zealand's South Island

== See also ==
- The Man from Snowy River (poem), a poem by Australian bush poet Banjo Paterson
  - The Man from Snowy River (1982 film), an Australian adventure drama movie based on the poem
  - The Man from Snowy River II, the sequel
  - The Man from Snowy River (TV series), an Australian adventure drama television series based on the poem
- Snowy River Cave, a cave complex in New Mexico, USA
