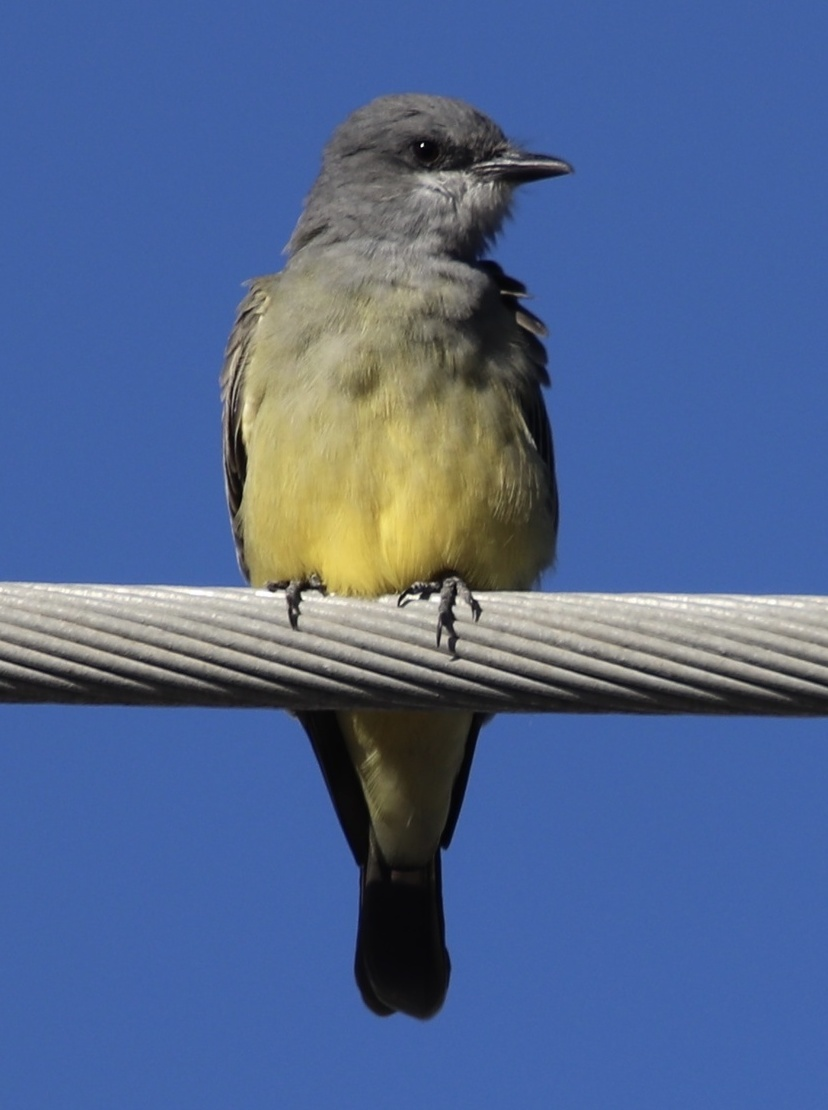

Conservation status
- Least Concern (IUCN 3.1)

Scientific classification
- Kingdom: Animalia
- Phylum: Chordata
- Class: Aves
- Order: Passeriformes
- Family: Tyrannidae
- Genus: Tyrannus
- Species: T. vociferans

Binomial name
- Tyrannus vociferans Swainson, 1826
- Breeding Year-round Non-Breeding

= Cassin's kingbird =

Species of bird

Cassin's kingbird (Tyrannus vociferans) is a large tyrant flycatcher native to western North America. The name of this bird commemorates the American ornithologist John Cassin.

== Taxonomy ==
Cassin's kingbird was formally described in 1826 by English naturalist William Swainson under the current binomial name Tyrannus vociferans. The type locality is Temascaltepec, Mexico. The specific epithet vociferans is Latin for "shouting".

Two subspecies are recognised:

- T. v. vociferans Swainson, 1826 – southwest USA to central Mexico
- T. v. xenopterus Griscom, 1934 – southwest Mexico

== Description ==
Adults have a gray head with slightly darker cheeks; a dark unforked tail with a buffy fringe and gray-olive underparts. They have a pale throat and deep yellow lower breast.

Juveniles are duller and have pale edges on their wings.

Measurements:

- Length: 8.3–9.1 in (21–23 cm)
- Weight: 1.6 oz (45 g)
- Wingspan: 41 cm

=== Similar species ===
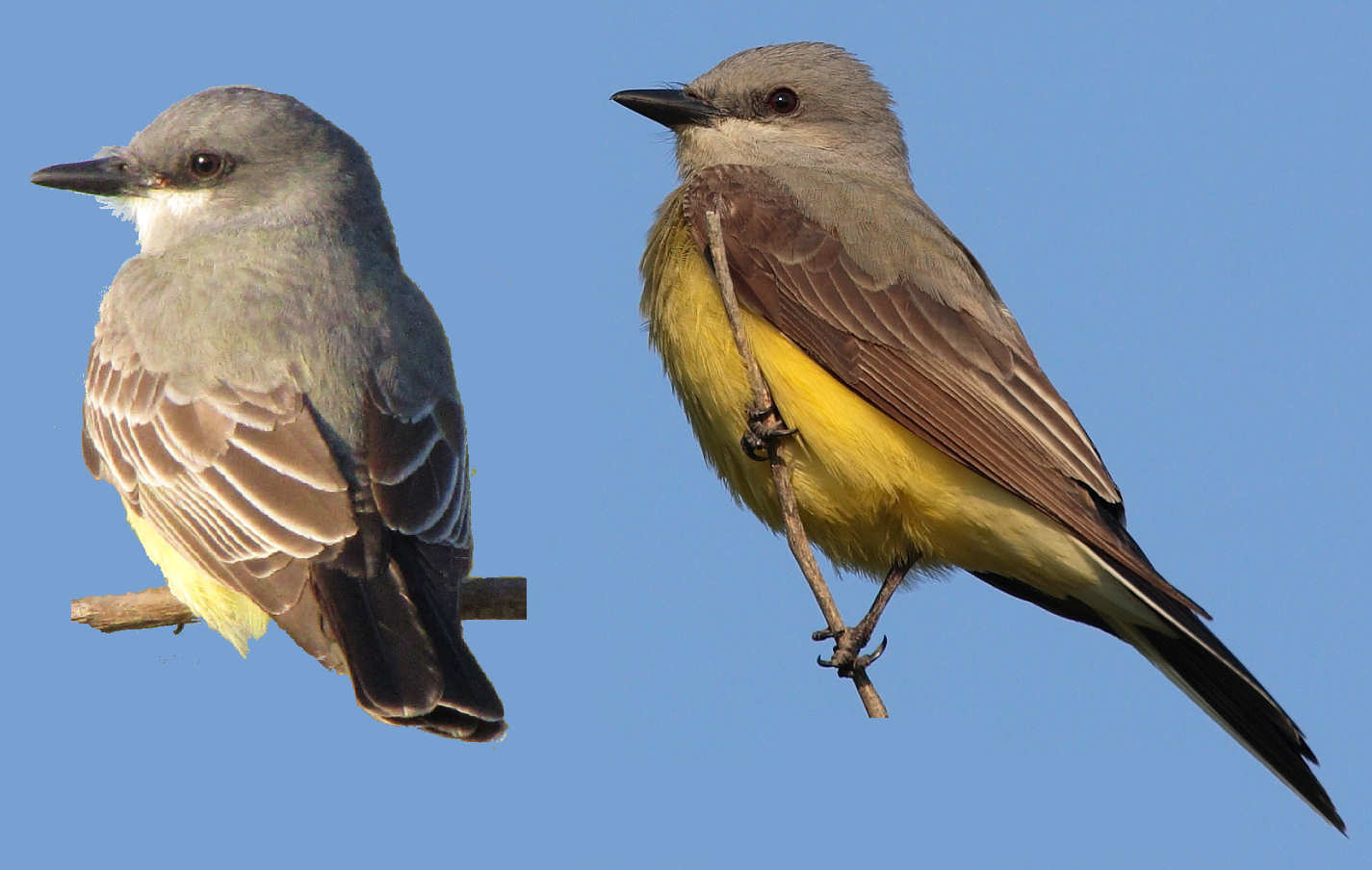
Comparison of a Cassin's (on the left) and western kingbird

Cassin's kingbird and the western kingbird are similar in appearance. Cassin's is a little larger than the western and the upper parts are a darker gray than the western. The most distinctive difference between these birds is that the Cassin's has a thin white edge along the distal end of the tail feathers, while the western kingbird has a thin white edge that runs along the side of the tail feathers. This difference can be seen in the adjacent image.

== Distribution and habitat ==
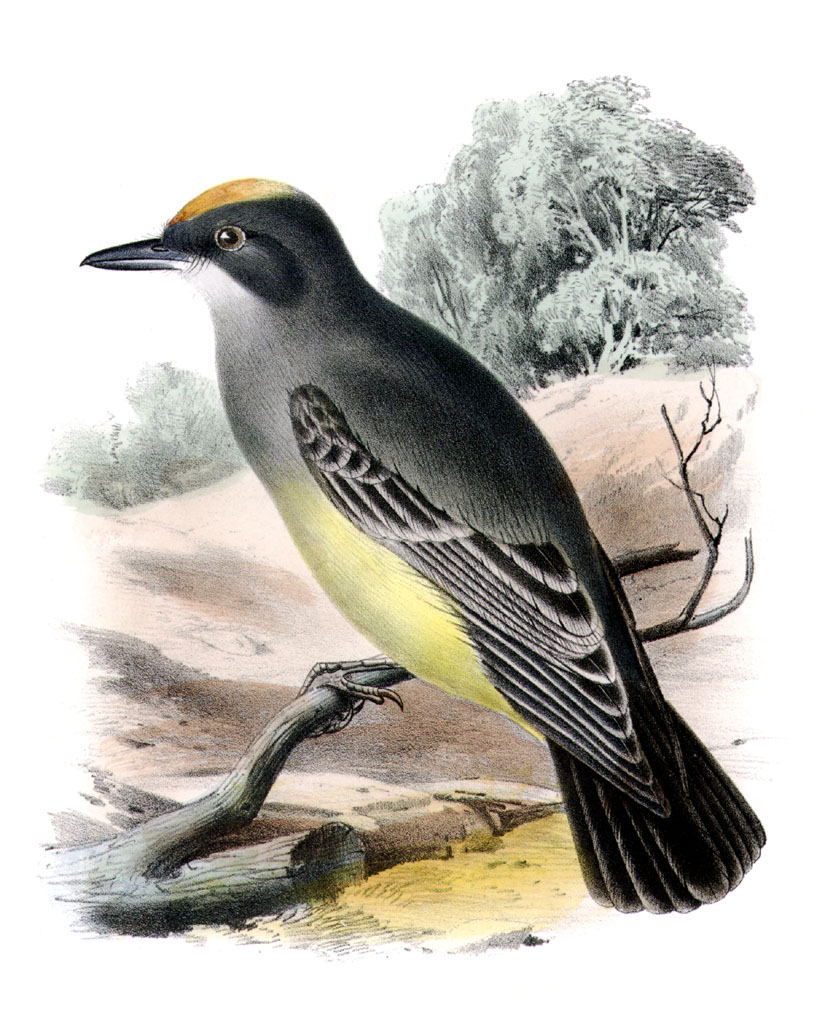
U.S. Government lithograph of Cassin's kingbird

In the summer, these birds can be found in California and from Montana to Utah, along the eastern Rocky Mountains. Their habitat includes rangelands and savannas.

These birds migrate to their winter quarters between Southern California and northern Central America. They are permanent residents in south-central Mexico, and their main wintering ranges are west of the Gulf of California on Baja California Sur, and east of the sea on the mainland of western Mexico.

== Behavior ==
They build a bulky nest on a horizontal tree limb in mid-story or the canopy of trees. The three to five spotted white eggs have an incubation period of 18 to 19 days.

The Cassin's kingbird primarily feeds on insects it preys upon from high perches by hawking. It also eats berries and fruits in lesser quantities.

The call is a high-pitched shorter followed by a longer chirp, sounding like chi-beer.

Like many other flycatchers, Cassin's kingbirds will often pump their tail up and down while perched in order to deter predators.

=== Mating ritual ===
In early spring, presumably after having chosen (or shown up with) their mate, they launch into a peculiar dance. With excited high-pitched calls, they hover in unison, wings outstretched, over a favorite perch. This dance takes place several times a day over several days, over several separate sites in an area covering 2 to 3 acres (8,100 to 12,100 m^{2}). The sites chosen for the dance appear to be the same sites used as hunting perches during the spring and summer.
