= AKD =

AKD or akd may refer to:

== Organisations ==
- AKD Group, a financial institution in Pakistan, owner of AKD Securities
- AKD motorcycles, Tyseley, Birmingham, UK
- Alpha Kappa Delta, an international honor society of sociology
- Aker Drilling, Oslo Stock Exchange symbol

== Transportation ==
- Akdeniz Airlines (ICAO code), a former charter airline from Turkey
- Akola Airport (IATA code), India
- A US Navy hull classification symbol: Cargo ship dock (AKD)

== Other uses ==
- Anura Kumara Dissanayake, president of Sri Lanka since 2024, known by his initials AKD
- Akpet language (ISO 639: akd)
- Alkyl ketene dimer
- Avian keratin disorder, a disorder involving deformities of the beak and claws in birds

== See also ==
- AKD-10, one of the Chinese air-to-surface / anti-tank missiles
