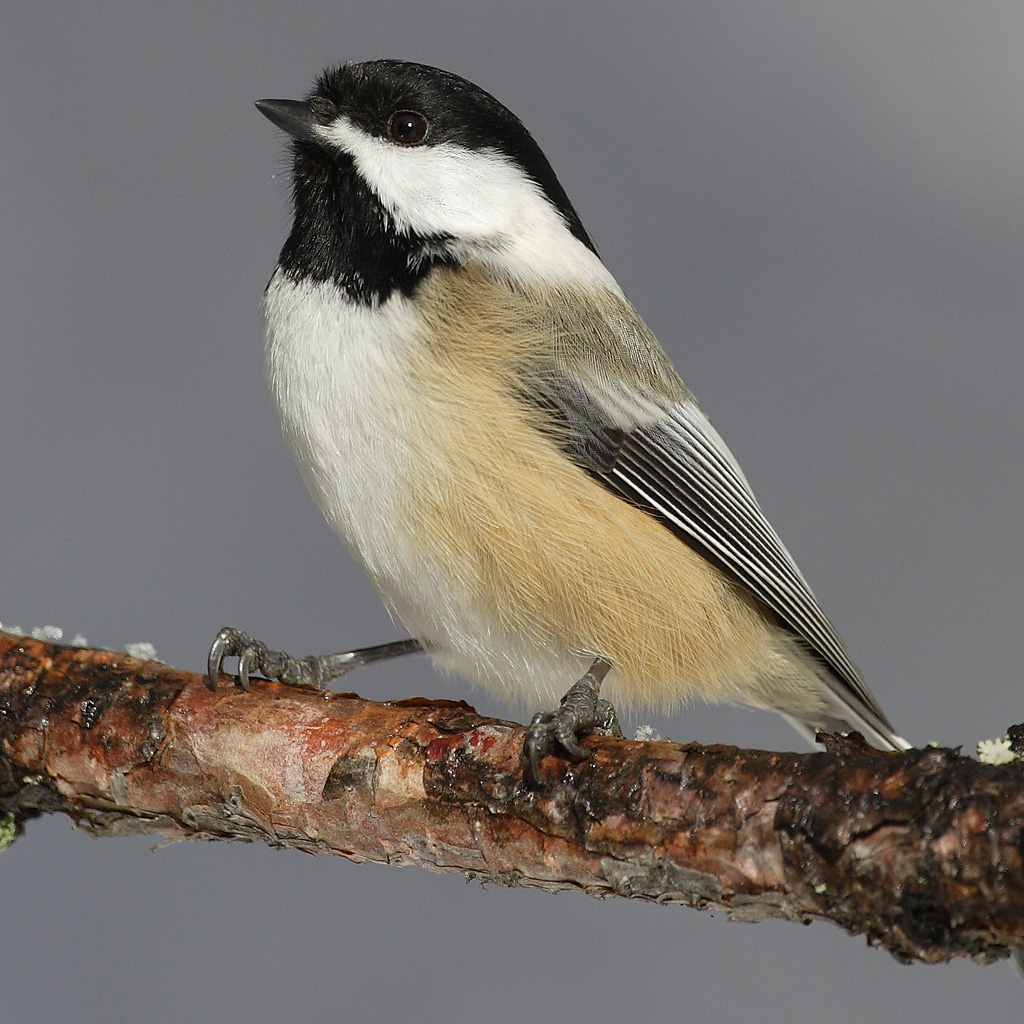

Conservation status
- Least Concern (IUCN 3.1)

Scientific classification
- Kingdom: Animalia
- Phylum: Chordata
- Class: Aves
- Order: Passeriformes
- Family: Paridae
- Genus: Poecile
- Species: P. atricapillus

Binomial name
- Poecile atricapillus (Linnaeus, 1766)
- Range of Poecile atricapillus

Synonyms
- Parus atricapillus Linnaeus, 1766

= Black-capped chickadee =

Species of small, non-migratory, North American passerine

The black-capped chickadee (Poecile atricapillus) is a small, nonmigratory, North American passerine bird that lives in deciduous and mixed forests. It is a member of the Paridae family, also known as tits. It has a distinct black cap on its head, a black bib underneath, and white cheeks. It has a white belly, buff sides, and grey wings, back, and tail. The bird is well known for its vocalizations, including its fee-bee song and its chick-a-dee-dee-dee call, from which it derives its name.

The black-capped chickadee is widely distributed throughout North America, ranging from the northern United States to southern Canada and all the way up to Alaska and Yukon. It feeds primarily on insects and seeds, and is known for its ability to cache food for use during the winter. The hippocampus of the black-capped chickadee grows during the caching season, which is believed to help it better remember its cache locations. The black-capped chickadee is a social bird and forms strict dominance hierarchies within its flock. During the winter, these flocks include other bird species. It has the ability to lower its body temperature during cold winter nights, allowing it to conserve energy.

Black-capped chickadees build nests in tree cavities, with the nesting season starting in late April and lasting until late June. They lay on average 6–8 eggs, which hatch after 11–14 days. Juveniles fledge 12–16 days after hatching.

The population of black-capped chickadees is thought to be increasing, and they are considered a species of least concern by the International Union for Conservation of Nature (IUCN). It is the state bird of both Massachusetts and Maine in the United States, and the provincial bird of New Brunswick in Canada.

== Taxonomy ==
In 1760, French zoologist Mathurin Jacques Brisson included a description of the black-capped chickadee in his book Ornithologie based on a specimen collected in Canada. He used the French name La mésange a tête noire de Canada and the Latin Parus Canadensis Atricapillus. Although Brisson gave it Latin names, these do not conform to the binomial system and are not recognized by the International Commission on Zoological Nomenclature. In 1766, Swedish naturalist Carl Linnaeus published the 12th edition of his Systema Naturae, which included 240 species that had been previously described by Brisson. One of these was the black-capped chickadee. Linnaeus included a brief description, coined the binomial name Parus atricapillus and cited Brisson's work. The specific epithet atricapillus is Latin for "black-haired" from ater (black) and capillus (hair of the head).

Though originally placed in the genus Parus with most other tits, mtDNA cytochrome b sequence data and morphology suggested that separating Poecile more adequately expressed these birds' relationships. The genus Poecile had been introduced by German naturalist Johann Jakob Kaup in 1829, and the American Ornithologists' Union moved the black-capped chickadee into this genus in 1998. Molecular phylogenetic studies have shown that the black-capped chickadee is sister to the mountain chickadee (Poecile gambeli).

The following cladogram shows the relationships between the various chickadee species, a subset of genus Poecile:

- - - - - Grey-headed chickadee (Poecile cinctus)
        - - Chestnut-backed chickadee (Poecile rufescens)
          - Boreal chickadee (Poecile hudsonicus)
      - - - Mexican chickadee (Poecile sclateri)
          - - Carolina chickadee (Poecile carolinensis)
            - - Black-capped chickadee (Poecile atricapillus)
              - Mountain chickadee (Poecile gambeli)

Until the late 1900s, the black-capped chickadee was considered by some to be conspecific with the willow tit of Eurasia and the Carolina chickadee, due to their very similar appearance. A 1989 study demonstrated that the Willow tit and black-capped chickadee were different species; however, the distinction of the Carolina chickadee remained in question until 2005.

=== Subspecies ===
Nine subspecies are currently recognized. They are presented below in the taxonomic order set by the International Ornithologists' Union (IOC)

- Poecile atricapillus turneri (Ridgway, 1884): Found in southern Alaska and northwest Canada and has the palest colouring of all subspecies.
- Poecile atricapillus occidentalis (Baird, 1858): Ranges from southwest British Columbia to northwest California, and is the smallest in size and darkest in colouring of all subspecies.
- Poecile atricapillus fortuitus (Dawson, 1909): Ranges from inland southwest Canada to northwest U.S., and is notably buffier than other subspecies.
- Poecile atricapillus septentrionalis (Harris, 1846): Ranges from western and central Canada to southern U.S. It is visually similar to P. a. atricapillus but has slightly longer wings and tail.
- Poecile atricapillus bartletti (Alrich & Nutt, 1939): Lives only in Newfoundland, Canada, and is the only species with different mtDNA, likely due to geographic isolation. It is larger and darker than P. a. atricapillus.
- Poecile atricapillus atricapillus (Linnaeus, 1766): Nominate subspecies, which ranges from eastern and central Canada to northeastern U.S.
- Poecile atricapillus garrinus (Behle, 1951): Lives in western central U.S. It has a brown back and buff rump.
- Poecile atricapillus nevadensis (Linsdale, 1938): Lives in western U.S., and is visually similar to P. a. septentrionalis but with paler edges to the wings and tail.
- Poecile atricapillus practicus (Oberholser, 1937): Lives in the Appalachian Mountains in the eastern U.S. Similar to P. a. atricapillus, although slightly smaller, less dark on the back, and less prominent white edge to the wings and tail.

== Description ==
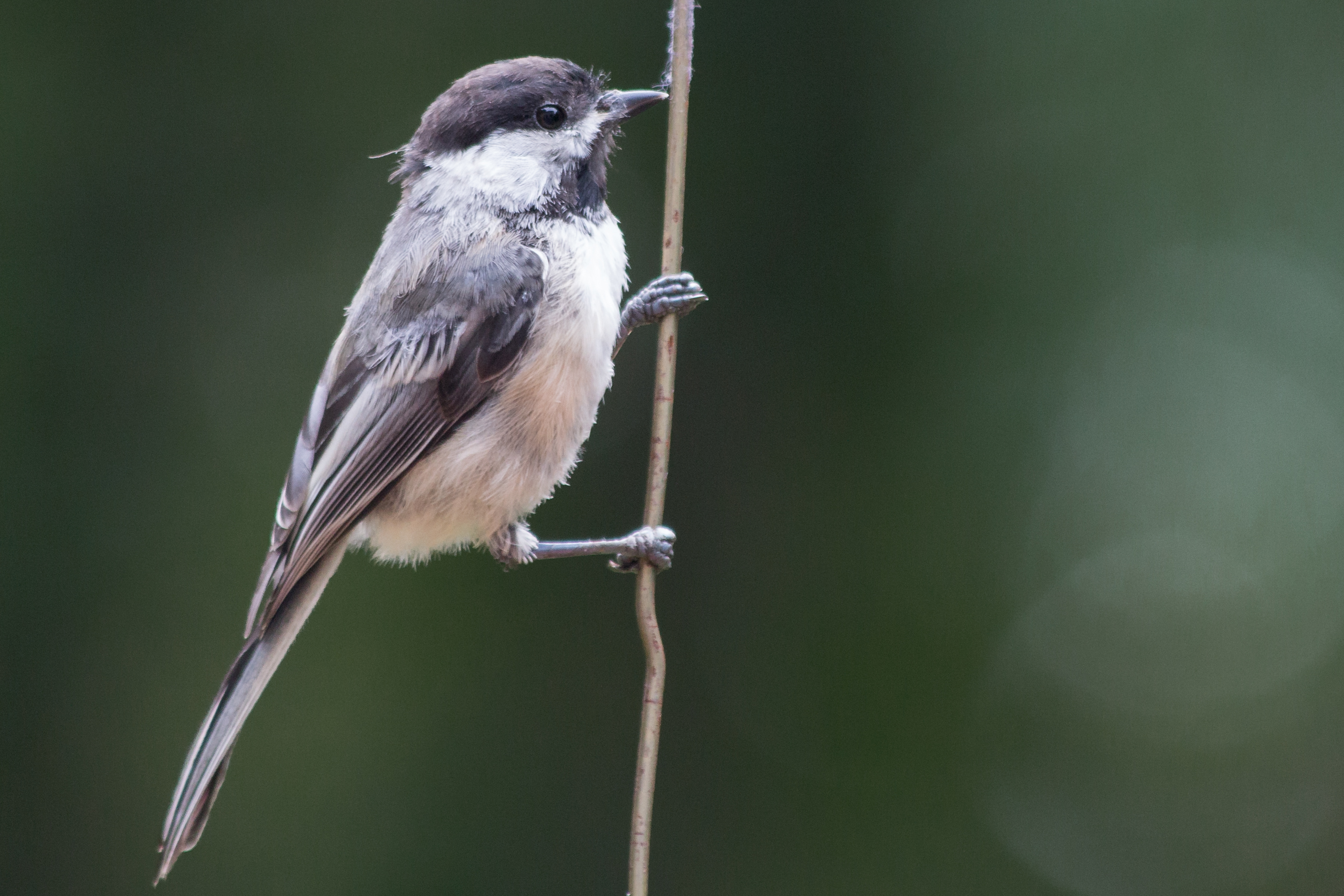
Black-capped chickadee clinging to a wire

The black-capped chickadee has a black cap and "bib" with white cheeks. Its underparts are white with buff-coloured flanks. Its back is unstreaked and greenish grey, and the tail and wings are slate grey. It has a black beak and legs, and dark brown irises. Males and females are generally similar, although males have a larger bib. They can also be distinguished based on a combination of weight and tail length. Tarsus length does not significantly differentiate sexes. Males have a wing length of 63.5–67.5 mm (2.50–2.66 in), a tail length of 58–63 mm (2.3–2.5 in), a bill length of 8–9.5 mm (0.31–0.37 in), and a tarsus length of 16–17 mm (0.63–0.67 in). Females are on average slightly smaller, with a wing length of 60.5–66.5 mm (2.38–2.62 in), a tail length of 56.3–63 mm (2.22–2.48 in), a bill length of 9–9.5 mm (0.35–0.37 in), and a tarsus length of 16–17 mm (0.63–0.67 in). Both sexes weigh 10–14 g (0.35–0.49 oz). Juveniles are visually similar to adults but with fluffier plumage.

Although range can generally be used to separate them, the black-capped chickadee is very similar in appearance to the Carolina chickadee. The edges of the wings are somewhat paler than the Carolina chickadee, and the bib of the black-capped chickadee has a "messier" border than the Carolina chickadee. The most reliable way to distinguish the two species is by vocalizations. Black-capped chickadees have a slower, hoarser, two-part song, whereas Carolina chickadees have a three-part song.

Black-capped chickadees are also somewhat similar to mountain chickadees and boreal chickadees. Mountain chickadees can be distinguished by a distinct white stripe above their eyes, and boreal chickadees have a brown cap as opposed to the black cap of the black-capped chickadee.

=== Vocalization ===
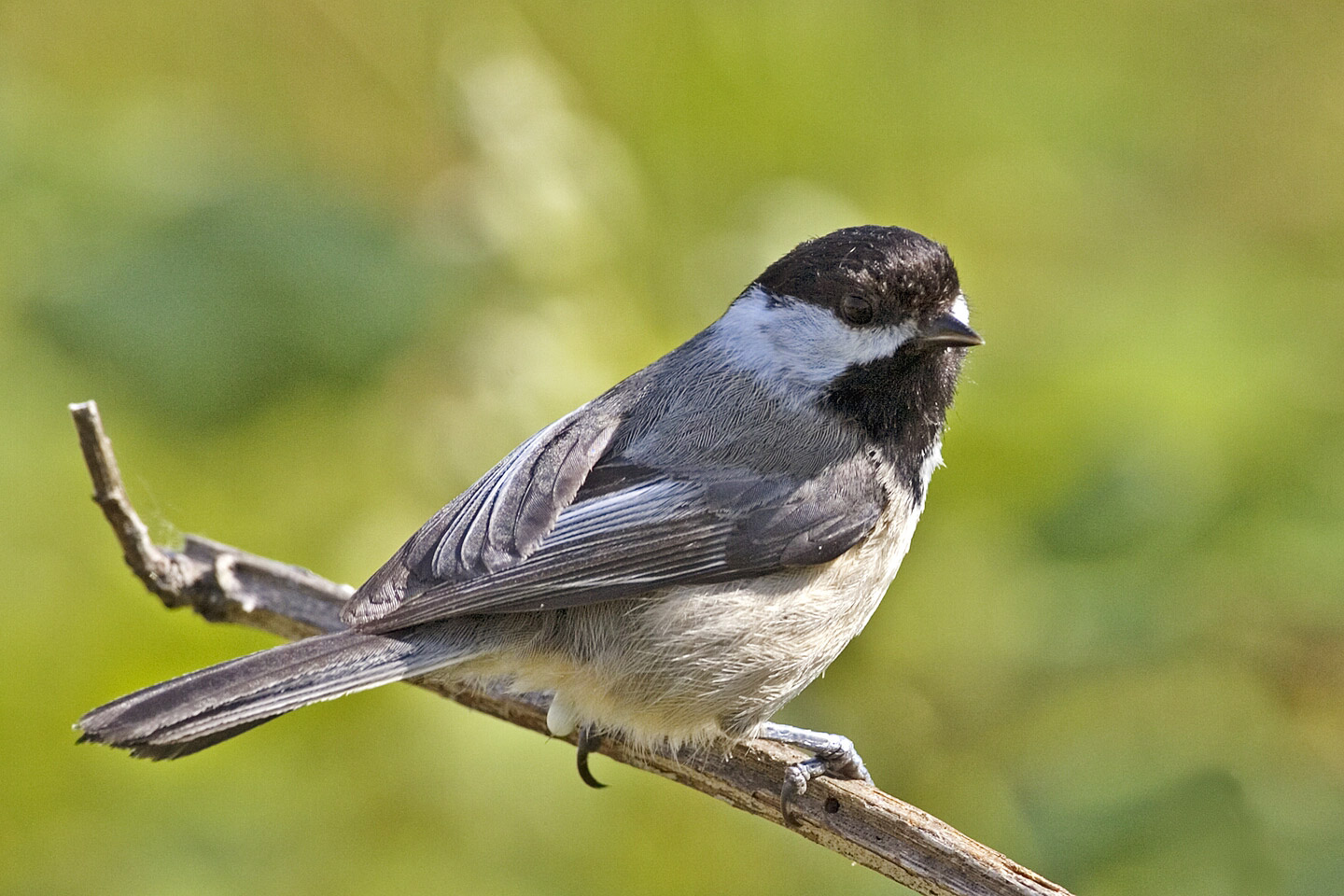
Black-capped chickadee, Iona Beach Regional Park

The vocalizations of the black-capped chickadee are highly complex, with 16 distinct types of vocalizations being used to convey an array of information. These vocalizations are likely an evolutionary adaptation to their habitat; they live and feed in dense vegetation, and even when the flock is close together, individual birds tend to be out of each other's visual range.

One of the most recognizable sounds produced, particularly by the males, is the two-note fee-bee song. It is a simple, clear whistle of two notes, identical in rhythm, the first roughly a whole-step above the second. The frequency of their songs typically starts around 400 Hz, and various tones spanning roughly 1 kHz are sung within the song. A decrease of roughly 200 Hz occurs when the first note (fee) is sung, and then another decrease around 400 Hz takes place between the end of fee and the beginning of bee. In spite of these multiple changes in frequency, though, anybody listening to the song only hears a pure, high-frequency tone. This is distinguished from the Carolina chickadee's four-note call fee-bee fee-bay; the lower notes are nearly identical but the higher fee notes are omitted, making the black-capped song like bee bay. The males sing the song only in relative isolation from other chickadees (including their mates). In late summer, some young birds sing only a single note.

Black-capped chickadee "fee-bee" song
Some fee-bee songs of chickadees at various distances.

NOTE: The chick-a-dee-dee call in the background at 0:05

Both sexes sometimes make a faint version of the fee-bee song, and this appears to be used when feeding young. During breeding, the male may make this call to attempt to attract a female. During nesting, this call is used by both sexes to call to their partner when not in sight. Distinguishing males and females based solely on their singing is difficult. A bioacoustic analysis performed on both male and female songs revealed that male fee-bee singing fluctuates more, and the absolute amplitude of both sexes is the same.

The most familiar call is the chick-a-dee-dee-dee, which gave this bird its name. This simple-sounding call is astonishingly complex. Scientists have been studying it since the mid-1970s. It is produced by both males and females year-round. It has been observed to consist of up to four distinct units—referred to as A, B, C, and D. A, B, and C are variations of the "chick-a" part of the call, and D is the repeated "dee". These can be arranged in different patterns to communicate information about threats from predators and coordination of group movement. These four notes only ever appear in this consecutive order with each preceding note blending into the next; however, not all four notes always appear in the call. Like other sounds the chickadee produces, it may be heard in multiple variations. The A and B notes are almost identical to one another in both frequency and duration, though black-capped chickadees possess the ability to quickly notice the difference between these two notes. No such similarity is seen between the C and D notes. The C note fluctuates from low to high then back to low, whereas the D note has a constant frequency. While not confirmed, one study found evidence of a function behind the C and D notes: the C note is used indicate the location of food, and the D note is used to distinguish between a member of the same species and a potential predator.

Neither individual notes nor groups of notes have an equal probability of appearing in the chick-a-dee-dee-dee song. Its syntax form may take on several different structures, but the two most commonly heard are [A][D] and [B][C][D]. (Note: Brackets indicate that a note may be repeated more than once.) Calls containing the D note are most frequently heard. A study of the call showed that the number of dees indicates the level of threat from nearby predators. In an analysis of over 5,000 alarm calls from chickadees, alarm calls triggered by small, dangerous raptors had a shorter interval between chick and dee and tended to have extra dees, typically four instead of two. In one case, a warning call about a pygmy owl—a prime threat to chickadees—contained 23 dees. The Carolina chickadee makes a similar call, which is faster and higher-pitched.

Other species have also been observed making use of these chick-a-dee-dee-dee alarm calls. During the non-breeding season, mixed species flocks may form to help with foraging and predator avoidance, and may include nuthatches, woodpeckers, kinglets, and vireos among others. These species will react when a chickadee makes the alarm call. Red-breasted nuthatch have even been observed reacting more strongly to higher-threat alarm calls, indicating some understanding of their syntax.

Black-capped chickadee
Some 'gargles', then a minute of singing

NOTE: American robin singing in background

Black-capped chickadees make a number of other calls and sounds, such as a gargle noise usually used by males to indicate a threat of attacking another male, often when feeding. This call is also used in sexual contexts. Black-capped chickadees learn the gargle noise soon after birth and continues to develop it through to adulthood. This noise is among the most complex of the calls; in one population of chickadees, the gargle contained 2 to 9 instances of 14 distinct notes, all sung within half a second.

Social learning in particular is largely influential to the development of the gargle. Beginning 30 to 35 days after birth, strings of low-amplitude precursor or sub-gargles are produced for about a minute. At this time, they learn to produce such sounds by listening to their parents and siblings. Three chickadee populations were observed at three different sites over 8 years, and all of them produced vocalizations that were very similar to one another. Strings of juvenile sub-gargles are almost perfectly continuous and both low and unstable in frequency, yet lacking multiple syllables. When their vocal abilities are fully developed, a stable frequency is produced and a variety of syllables is heard that vary in length.

Other calls which have been noted include a "broken dee", "variable see", hiss, snarl twitter, "high zee", and tseet. Some of these calls are used during breeding to attract a mate or reinforce a pair bond, such as the "broken dee" and "variable see". Others, such as the snarl and twitter, are used territorially.

Black-capped chickadees in an environment with ambient noise at the same frequencies as their songs are able to adjust the frequency of their songs to effectively communicate with the surrounding population. When interacting with other chickadees close by, the males matched their frequencies; however, when the surrounding environment was noisy with other species, the males adapted by increasing the frequency of their songs. Another survey, though, showed that male chickadees sometimes intentionally match the tones of competing chickadees as a way of showing aggression. Dominant males in a population often compete with lower-ranked males, and singing contests are a way male chickadees decide who gets to mate. When a male loses a contest, particularly a higher-ranking male in the population, he will often have difficulty finding a mate.

== Distribution and habitat ==
Black-capped chickadees are non-migratory and can be found throughout much of North America. They range from western Alaska, through southern Yukon and throughout the Canadian provinces, from British Columbia in the west to the Maritimes and Newfoundland in the east. The distribution continues into the United States, with its range extending to northern California in the south-west, through northern Nevada and New Mexico, continuing through the midwestern United States to New Jersey. It can also be found in the Appalachian Mountains at higher elevations. In British Columbia, the black-capped chickadee is absent on Vancouver Island, the Gulf Islands, Haida Gwaii, and parts of the Sunshine Coast, where it is replaced by the chestnut-backed chickadee. They are typically most common at elevations below 750 m (2,460 ft), although they have been known to occur at up to 3,200 m (10,500 ft).

Black-capped chickadees inhabit wooded areas, including both coniferous and deciduous forests, urban parks, willow thickets, and suburban areas. They do not vary their habitat between breeding and non-breeding seasons, although in the winter irregular bird migration and dispersal may occur.

== Behaviour and ecology ==
=== Diet and foraging ===
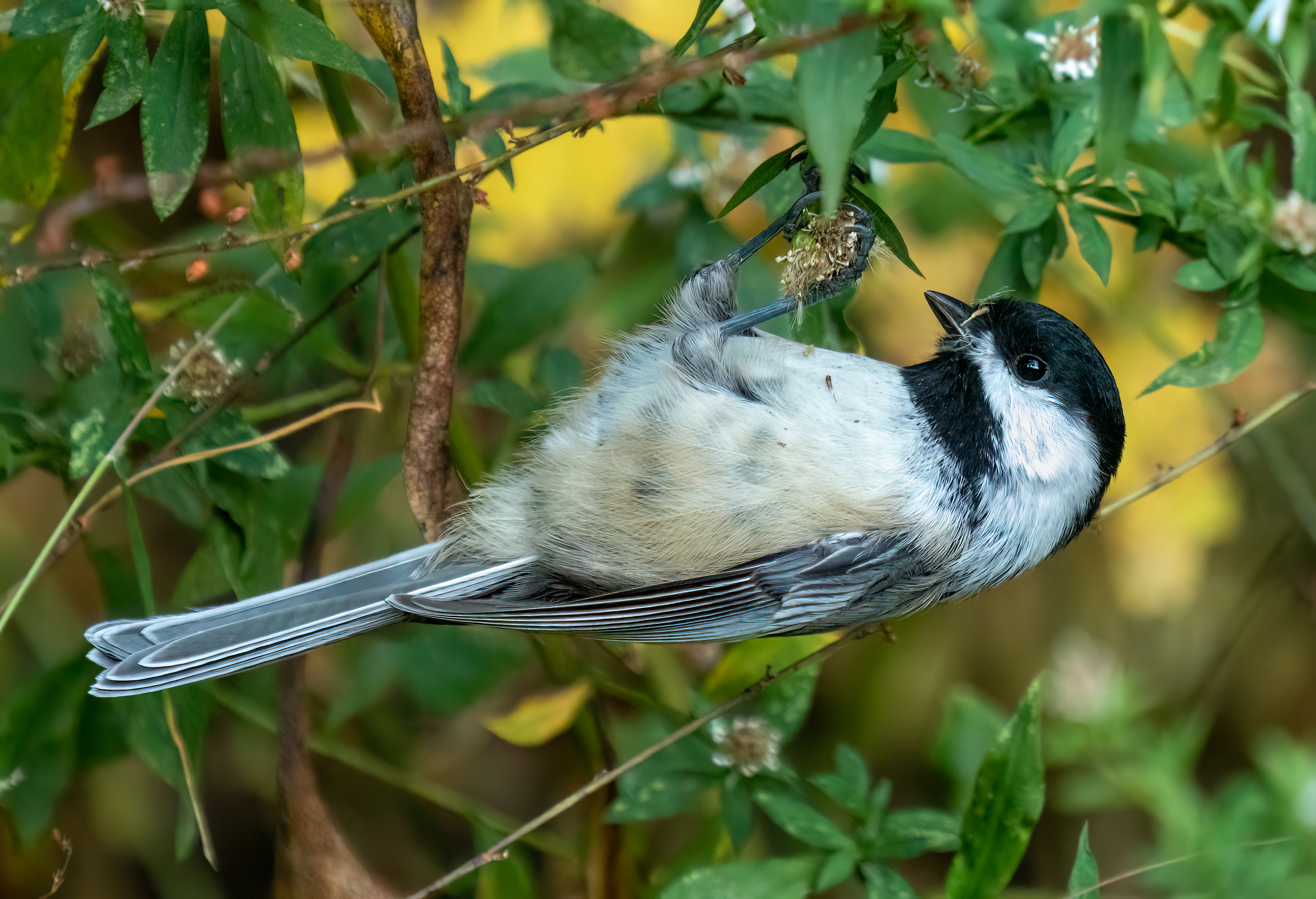
Eating seeds in Central Park

Black-capped chickadee working on a sunflower seed, Cap Tourmente National Wildlife Area, Quebec, Canada

Insects (especially caterpillars) form a large part of their diet in summer. The birds hop along tree branches searching for food, sometimes hanging upside down or hovering; they may make short flights to catch insects in the air. Seeds and berries become more important in winter, though insect eggs and pupae are eaten when available. Black-capped chickadees have also been known to eat the fat off of dead mammals. Sunflower seeds are readily taken from bird feeders. The birds take a seed in their beak and commonly fly from the feeder to a tree, where they proceed to hammer the seed on a branch to open it.

Like many other species in the family Paridae, black-capped chickadees commonly cache food, mostly seeds, but sometimes insects, also. Items are stored singly in various sites such as bark, dead leaves, clusters of conifer needles, or knothole. Memory for the location of caches can last up to 28 days. Within the first 24 hours, the birds can even remember the relative quality of the stored items.

This caching behaviour has led to black-capped chickadees having larger hippocampi (Note: The hippocampus plays a role in converting short-term memory to long-term memory, as well as supporting spatial memory.) compared to other chickadees, who themselves have relatively larger hippocampi compared to other caching birds in the Paridae family. This variation in size also exists within the black-capped chickadee population based on the region they inhabit, with those who live in harsher climates (such as Alaska) having larger hippocampi. However, no variation exists between the sexes. The size of the hippocampus within black-capped chickadees also varies throughout the year, being the largest in October, and the smallest in February. While the exact reason for this seasonal change is unknown, it is believed that the hippocampus grows to allow the chickadee to remember its cache locations, and then shrinks as those caches are used up.

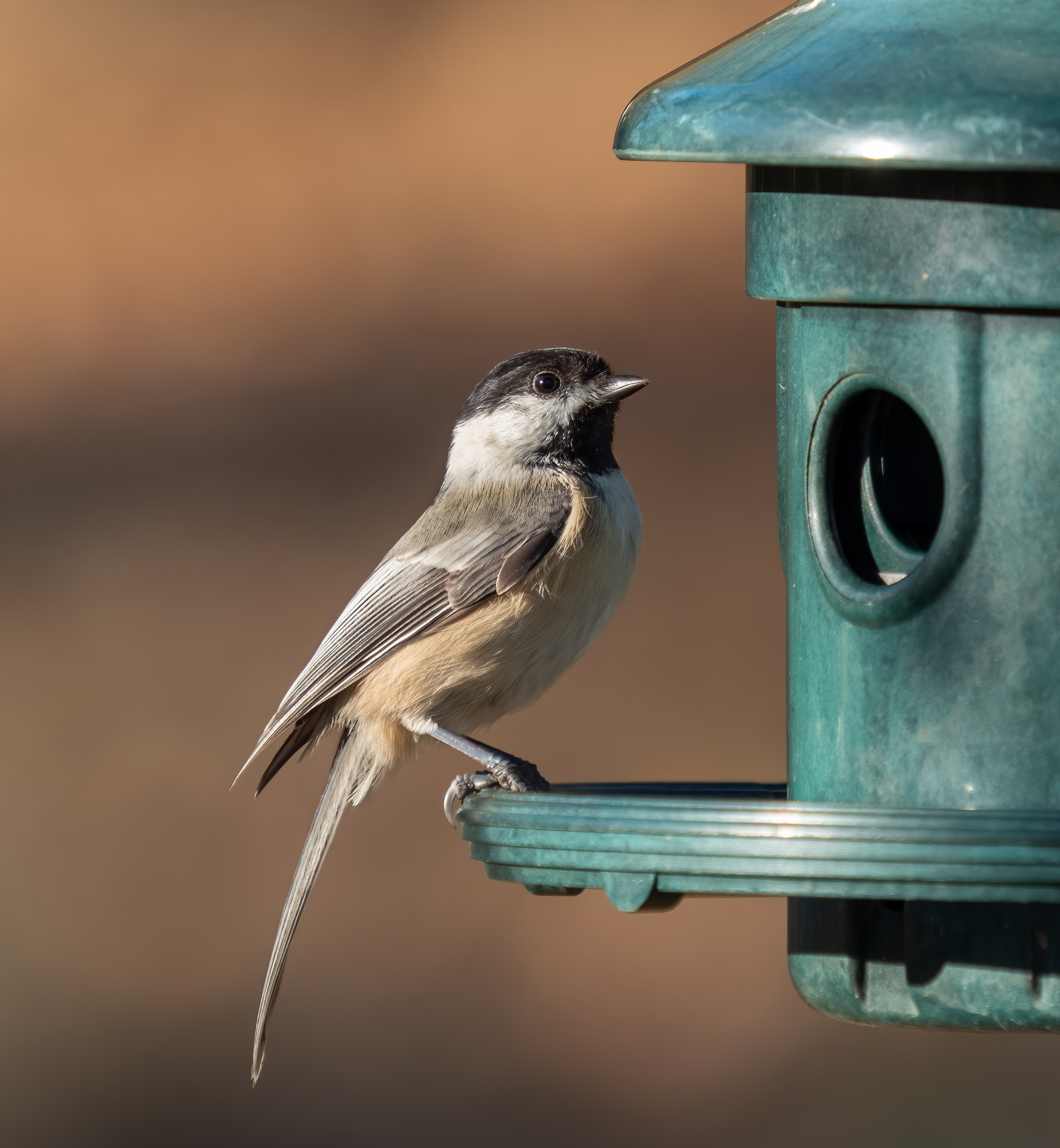
Black-capped chickadee at a feeder

Foraging behaviour in the winter tends to decrease, primarily being affected by lower temperatures and stronger winds. In parts of the black-capped chickadee's range with very cold winters, such as Minnesota, survival rates are affected by access to supplemental food. Chickadees with access to bird feeders in a very cold winter are twice as likely to survive than those without access to this supplemental food; months with severe weather when the temperature drops below −18 °C (0 °F) for more than five days make the primary difference between the survival rates with and without feeders. In Pennsylvania on the southern edge of their range, with milder winters, monitoring of populations with and without feeders suggests that feeders in milder weather influence movements of chickadees but not their actual survival.

=== Metabolism ===
On cold winter nights, these birds can reduce their body temperature by as much as 12°C (from their normal temperature of about 42°C) to conserve energy. Such a capacity for torpor is not very common in birds. Other bird species capable of torpor include the common swift (Apus apus), the common poor-will (Phalaenoptilus nuttallii), the lesser nighthawk (Chordeiles acutipennis), and various species of hummingbirds.

=== Movement and roosting ===
During the winter, chickadees often flock together. Many other species of birds – including titmice, nuthatches, and warblers – can often be found foraging in these flocks. Mixed flocks stay together because the chickadees call out whenever they find a good source of food. This calling-out forms cohesion for the group, allowing the other birds to find food more efficiently. Black-capped chickadees sleep in thick vegetation or in cavities, usually singly, though they may occasionally roost clumped together.

Their flight is slightly undulating with rapid wing beats. Flights are typically short bursts of less than 15 m (50 ft) with a speed around 20 km/h (12 mph). They tend to avoid flying through large open areas and will instead be found flying along tree-lines or through forests.

=== Moult ===
Chickadees moult once a year, starting in July or August and usually taking two to three months. They do not moult in the spring prior to breeding. The postjuvenal moult at the end of the first summer of life is partial, involving only the body feathers and wing coverts. In subsequent years, the postnuptial moult at the end of each reproductive season is always complete, involving all feathers. Moulting chickadees are not often seen, preferring to remain silent and hidden from view.

=== Dominance hierarchy ===
During the winter, the species forms flocks through which dominance hierarchies can be easily observed. Dominance hierarchies play an important role in determining the social behaviours among the birds in these flocks. Chickadees with higher social rankings have better access to food during the winter, which leads to them having a better body condition, increased territory size, and higher reproductive success. The hierarchies are linear and stable; once a relationship is established between two birds, it stays the same for many years. In general, older and more experienced birds are dominant over younger ones, and males are dominant over females. Dominant and subordinate members differ in their foraging strategies and risk-taking behaviours. Dominant individuals control access to preferred resources and restrict subordinates to foraging in novel, riskier, or suboptimal environments. A 2011 study demonstrated that this results in subordinate individuals being less cautious approaching novel foods and objects compared to their dominant counterparts. This is similar to subordinate primates, which feed on novel food more readily than the dominant individuals because they are more used to eating suboptimal and unfamiliar food. No difference is observed in ability to learn novel foraging tasks between dominant and subordinate individuals.

=== Breeding ===
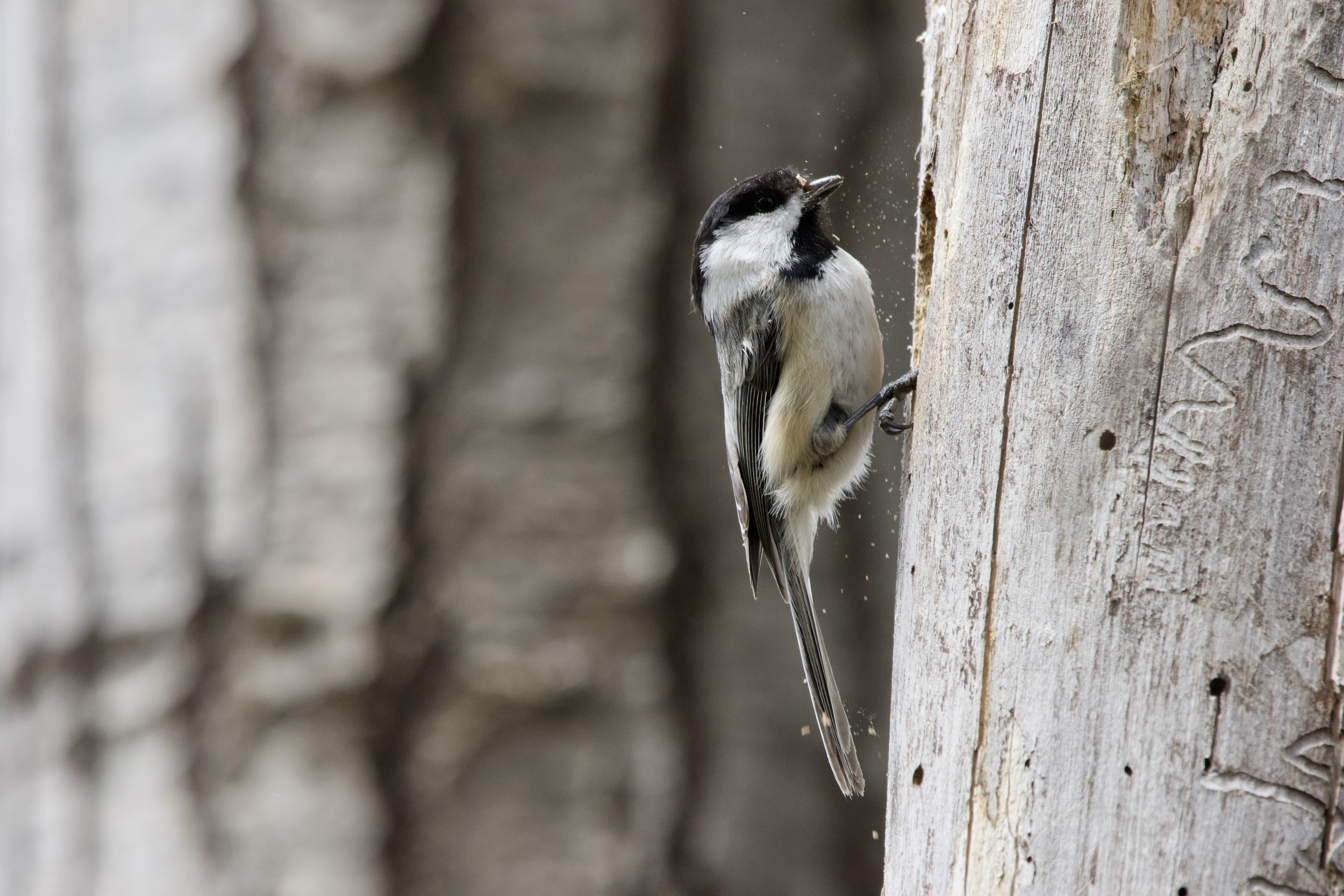
A black-capped chickadee excavating a nest cavity in a dead tree

Black-capped chickadees start to form breeding pairs in the late fall and into the winter. In the spring, the winter flocks will disperse into the constituent pairs. They are largely monogamous during this time, although occasionally males are observed mating with multiple females. Females prefer dominant males, and greater reproductive success is closely related to the higher ranking of the male.

The black-capped chickadee nests in tree cavities 1–7 m (3–23 ft) above ground. The pair either excavates the hole together, uses a natural cavity, or reuses an old woodpecker nest. This species will also nest in a nest box. There are at least two cases where chickadees have reused an open cup nest of another species. Nest sites are typically chosen by females, but excavation of the cavity is done by both sexes. The nest itself is built by the female only and consists of a base of coarse material such as moss or bark strips, and lining of finer material such as mammal hair. The nesting season is from late April through June, with higher-ranking females nesting before lower ranking ones. Eggs are white, with fine reddish brown dots that are concentrated at the larger end. On average, eggs are 1.52 cm × 1.22 cm (5/8 in × 1/2 in), and there are usually six to eight eggs. Incubation lasts 11–14 days and is by the female only; the male feeds her during this time. If an unusual disturbance occurs at the nest entrance, the incubating female may utter an explosive hiss like that of a snake, a probable adaptation to discourage nest predators.

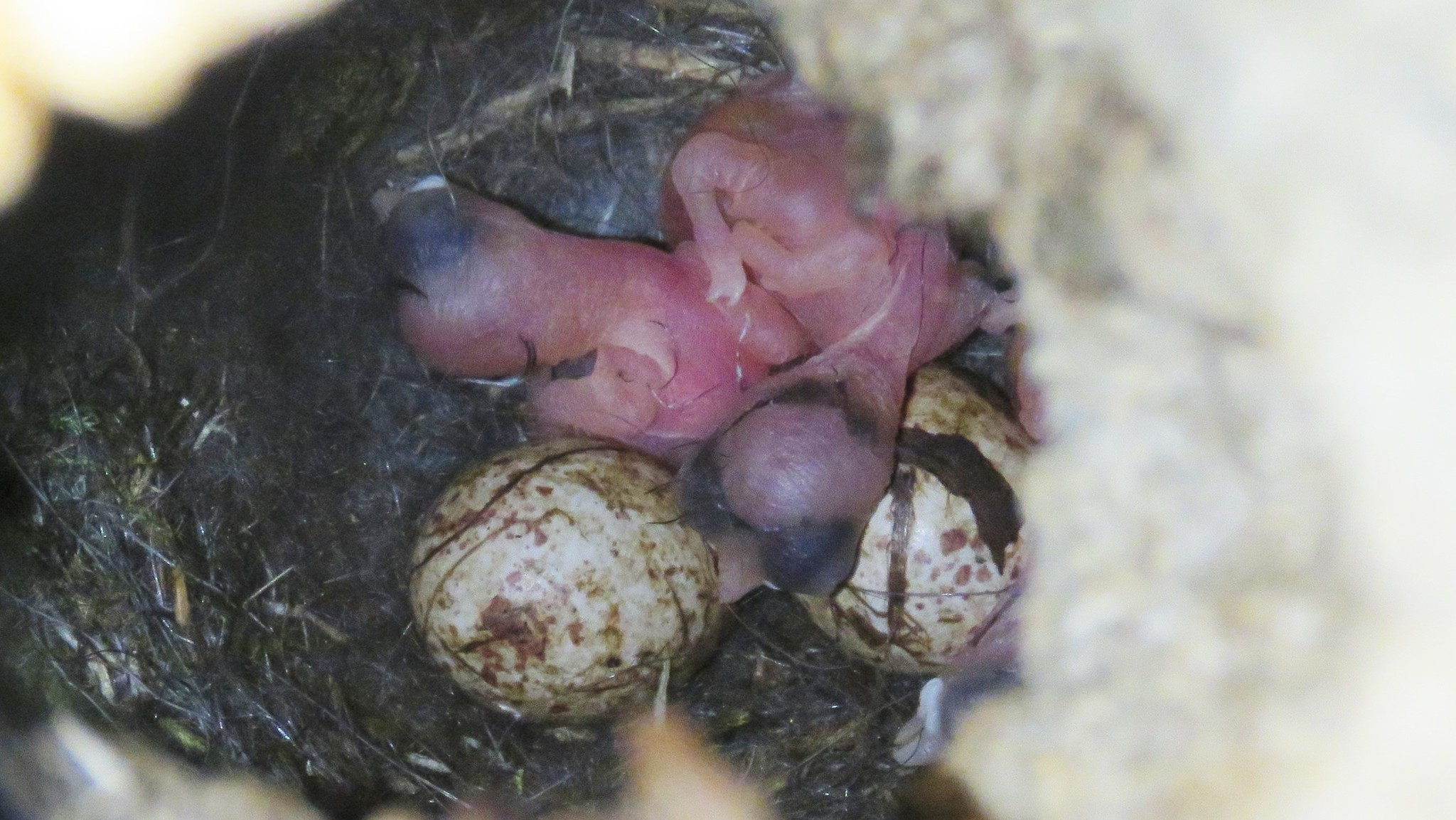
Black-capped chickadee hatchlings are altricial and born without feathers.

Hatchlings are altricial, emerging featherless with their eyes closed. Nestlings are fed by both sexes, but are brooded by the female only (the male brings food to her during brooding, which she passes on to the young). Young leave the nest 12–16 days after hatching, in great part because the parents start presenting food only outside the nest hole. The young are still fed by the parents for several weeks, but are capable of catching food on their own within a week after leaving the nest.

Black-capped chickadees usually breed only once a year, but second broods are possible if the first one is lost. First breeding is at one year of age. Maximum recorded lifespan is 12 years, although most live roughly 2.5 years.

Black-capped chickadees may interbreed with Carolina chickadees (Poecile carolinensis) or mountain chickadees (P. gambeli) where their ranges overlap. Interbreeding with boreal chickadees (P. hudsonicus) has also been documented, though it is more rare.

=== Predators and parasites ===
Black-capped chickadees are primarily subject to predation by birds of prey, including owls, hawks, and shrikes. Nest-predation also occurs, primarily by raccoons, squirrels, opossums, and snakes. Nest sites are also sometimes raided by house wrens, who will destroy chickadee eggs to reuse the location for their nest.

Like many birds, black-capped chickadees are susceptible to West Nile virus. They are also known to be affected by blood parasites, including those that cause malaria, but particularly high rates of infection have not been detected. Black-capped chickadees are also known to be affected by avian keratin disorder.

== State and provincial bird ==
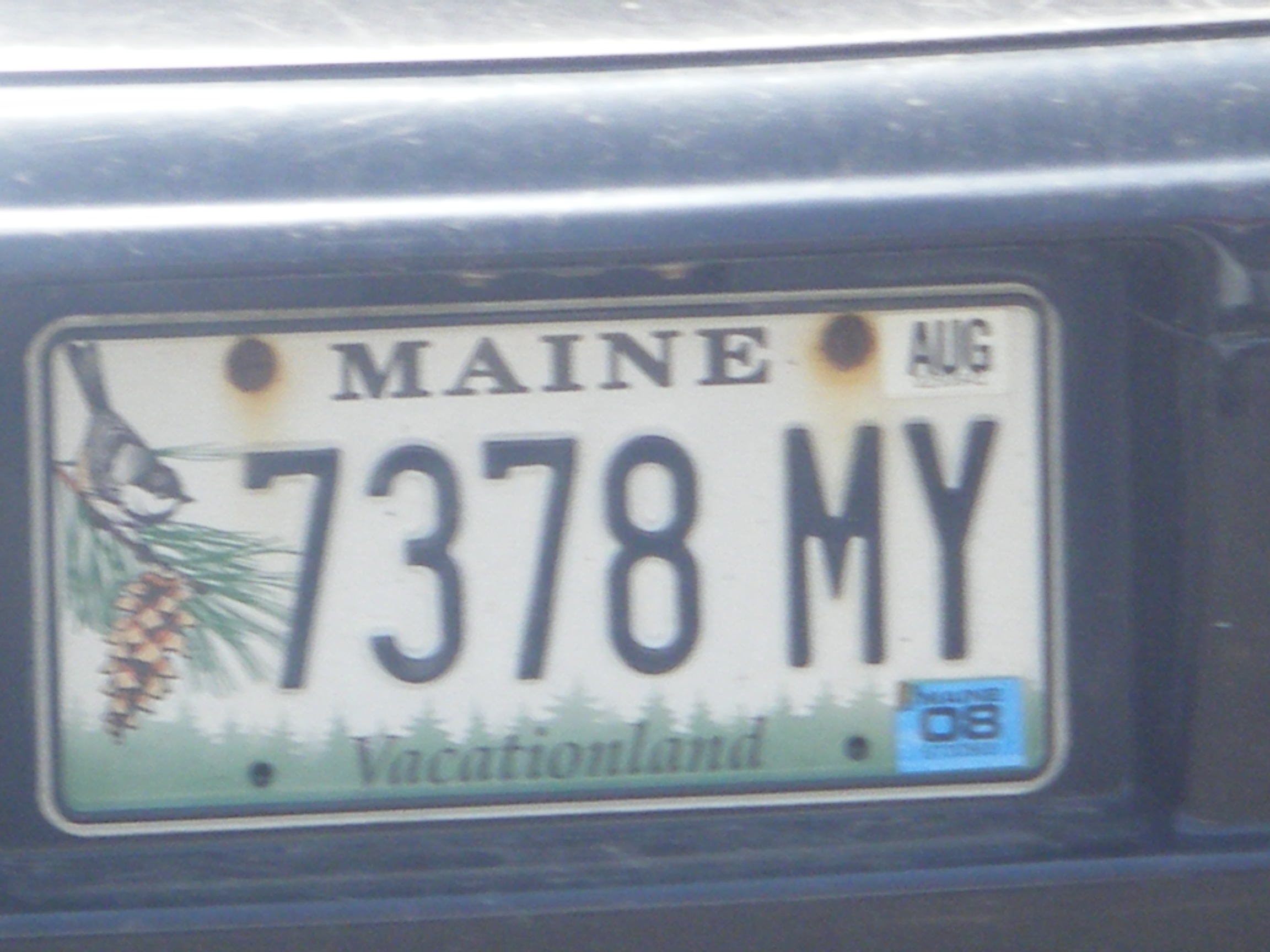
A Maine registration plate, with a black-capped chickadee on the left

The black-capped chickadee is the state bird of Maine and Massachusetts and the provincial bird of New Brunswick. In 2022 the black-capped chickadee was named the official bird of Calgary, Alberta. In 2015 the black-capped chickadee was voted the unofficial bird of Ottawa, Ontario. The bird was prominently featured on the retired standard Maine vehicle registration plate.

== Conservation ==
The IUCN classifies the black-capped chickadee as least concern due to its wide distribution and large populations. Yearly bird counts such as the Christmas Bird Count indicate that the population is increasing. The total population across its range is estimated to be 43 million mature individuals as of 2025.

Black-capped chickadees are known to suffer from human-related mortality causes such as flying into windows or dying from ingesting pesticide. Additionally, pets such as cats pose a threat to chickadees.
