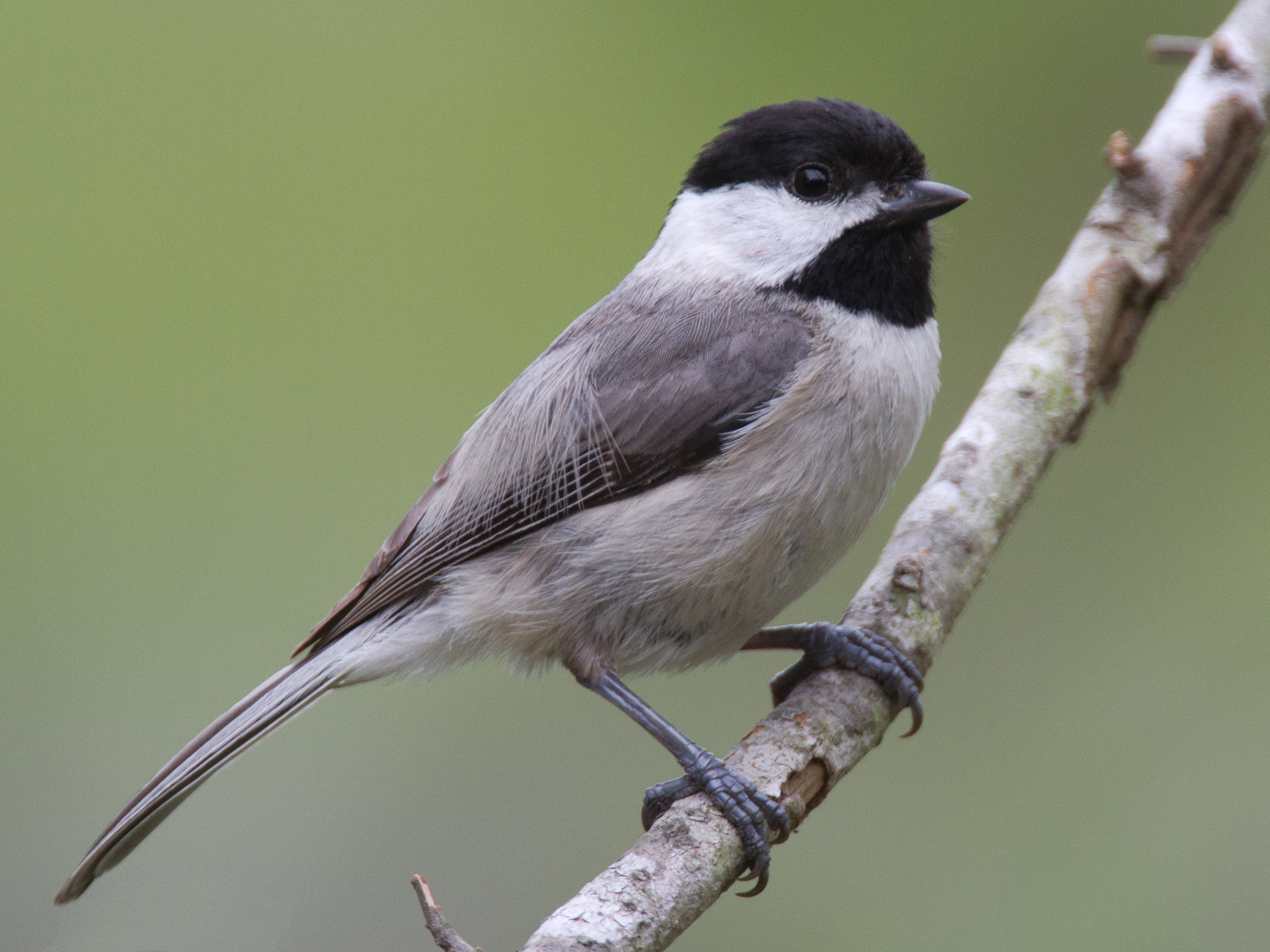

Conservation status
- Least Concern (IUCN 3.1)

Scientific classification
- Kingdom: Animalia
- Phylum: Chordata
- Class: Aves
- Order: Passeriformes
- Family: Paridae
- Genus: Poecile
- Species: P. carolinensis

Binomial name
- Poecile carolinensis (Audubon, 1834)
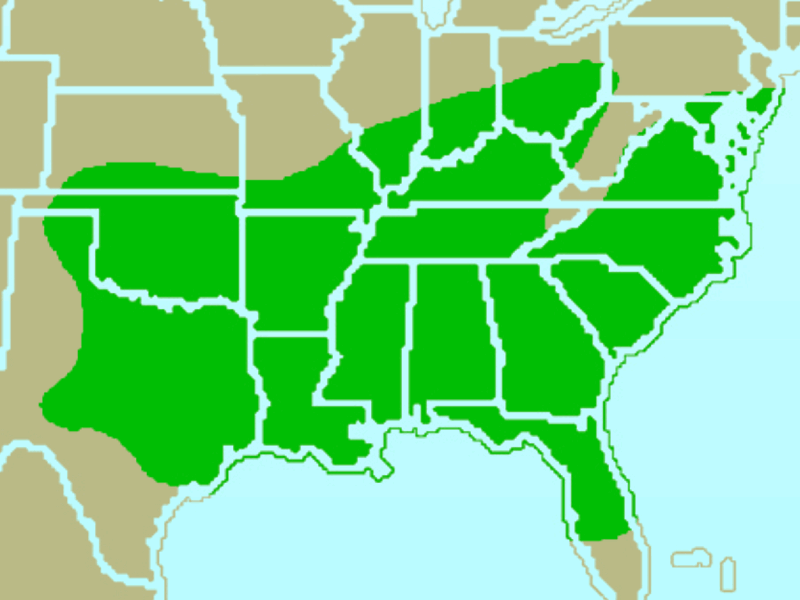
- Range of P. carolinensis

Synonyms
- Parus carolinensis

= Carolina chickadee =

Species of bird

The Carolina chickadee (Poecile carolinensis) is a small, non-migratory passerine bird in the tit family Paridae. It has a black cap and bib, and distinctive white cheeks. The bird looks extremely similar to the black-capped chickadee. It is largely found in the southeastern and central United States.

== Taxonomy ==
The Carolina chickadee was often placed in the genus Parus with most other tits, but mtDNA cytochrome b sequence data and morphology suggest that separating Poecile more adequately expresses these birds' relationships. The American Ornithologists' Union has been treating Poecile as distinct genus since 1998. Although it and the black-capped chickadee most likely diverged about 2.5 million years ago, the birds still hybridize in the areas where their ranges overlap. The offspring of mated pairs of hybrid chickadees suffer from lower hatching success, and a male bias sex ratio, consistent with Haldane's rule.

== Description ==
Adults are 10–12 cm (3.9–4.7 in) long with a weight of 8–12 g (0.28–0.42 oz) and a wingspan of 15–20 cm (5.9–7.9 in), and have a black cap and bib with white sides to the face. Their underparts are white with rusty brown on the flanks; their back is gray. They have a short dark bill, short wings and a moderately long tail. Very similar to the black-capped chickadee, the Carolina chickadee is distinguished by the slightly browner wing with the greater coverts brown (not whitish fringed) and the white fringing on the secondary feathers slightly less conspicuous; the tail is also slightly shorter and more square-ended. Without calls, visual distinction between the two species is very difficult even with an excellent view.

Eggs are about 1.5 cm (0.6 in) long and 1.1 cm (0.4 in) wide. Eggs are white with areas of reddish-brown ranging from dots to small blotches.

=== Vocalization ===
The calls and song between the Carolina chickadee and the black-capped chickadee differ subtly to an experienced ear: the Carolina chickadee's chick-a-dee call is faster and higher-pitched than that of the black-capped chickadee, and the Carolina chickadee has a four-note see-dee-see-dee song, whereas the black-capped chickadee has a two- or three-note song. In areas where the habitat of the Carolina chickadee and black-capped chickadee overlap, they can mimic each other's songs.

The origin of this bird name is onomatopoeic, a vocal imitation of its call. Native Americans called it tsi’kilili’. In English the sound was rendered as chickadee-dee-dee.

== Distribution and habitat ==
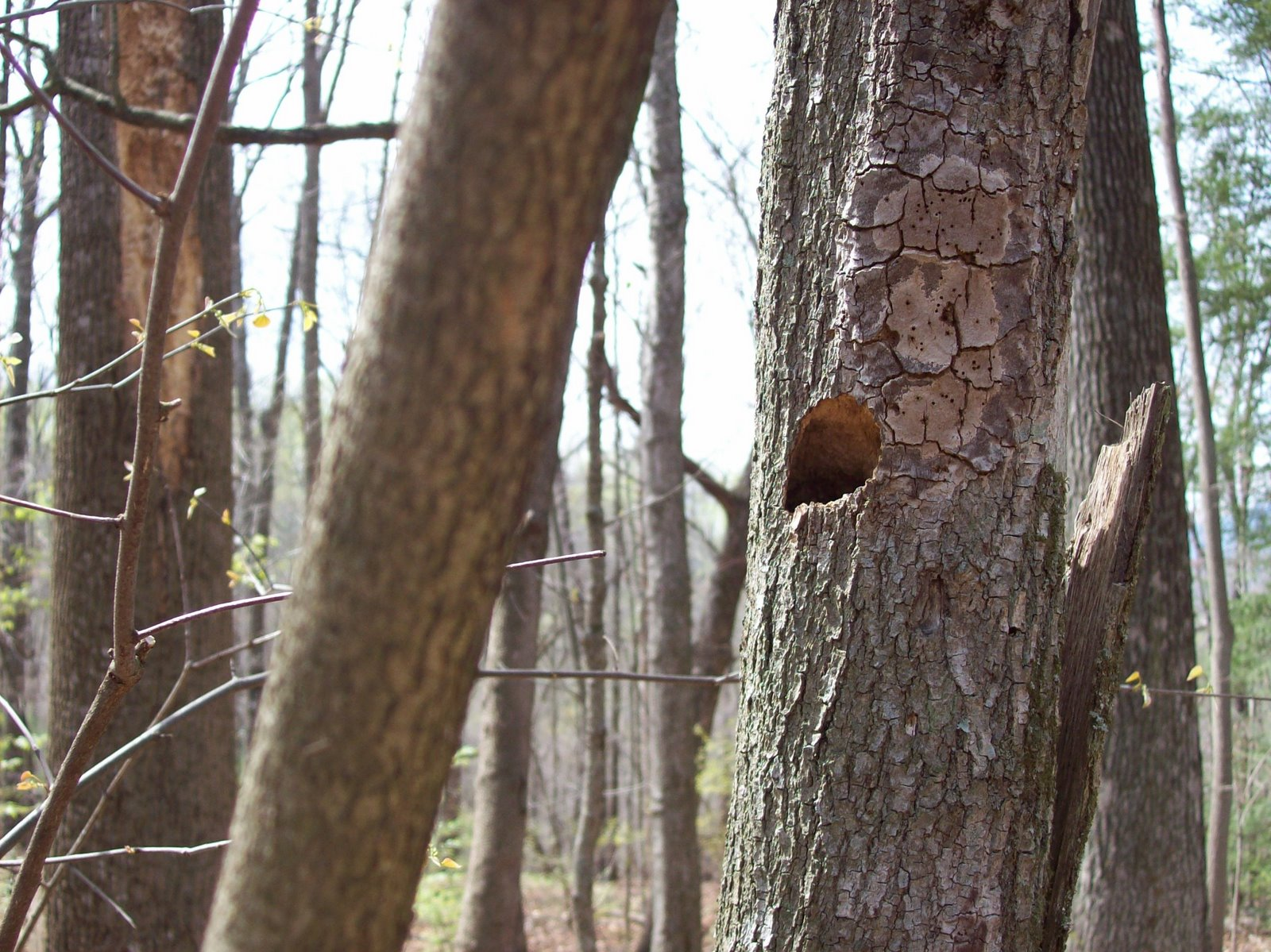
A Carolina chickadee cavity nest site, previously made by a red-bellied woodpecker

Their breeding habitat is mixed or deciduous forests in the United States from New Jersey and Pennsylvania west to southern Kansas and south to Florida and Texas; there is a gap in the range at high altitudes in the Appalachian Mountains where they are replaced by their otherwise more northern relative, the black-capped chickadee.

They are permanent residents, not usually moving south even in severe winter weather.

== Behavior and ecology ==
During the winter, chickadees often flock together. Each of the birds in a flock has a rank and in the spring, highly ranked birds will remain on the flock's territory for breeding, while lower-ranked birds must find new breeding territory. Many other species of birds, including titmice, nuthatches, and warblers can often be found foraging in these flocks. Mixed flocks occur about 50% of the time. Mixed flocks stay together because the chickadees call out whenever they find a good source of food. This calling out forms cohesion for the group, allowing the other birds to find food more efficiently.

Carolina chickadees actively defend individual spaces of 2–5 ft (0.6–1.5 m) apart; if another bird encroaches on these spaces, the dominant bird may make gargle calls. At feeders, these birds will usually take a seed and fly to a branch isolated from other birds to eat it. A 2022 study found that in high-quality foraging habitats, Carolina chickadees exhibit higher rates of gargle calls compared to low-quality foraging habitats.

These birds usually sleep in cavities, though they may sleep in branches. Different members of a flock will sleep in the same cavity from night to night. While females usually sleep in the nest cavity, males will normally sleep on a nearby branch.

=== Breeding ===
The Carolina chickadee nests in a hole in a tree; mating pairs excavate the nest, using a natural cavity or sometimes an old woodpecker nest. They may interbreed with black-capped chickadees where the ranges overlap, which can make identification even more difficult. The female will build the nest out of moss and strips of bark; she will then line it with hair or plant fibers. Clutches are usually made up of 3–10 eggs with an incubation period of 12–16 days. The nestling period is usually 16–19 days.

=== Food and feeding ===
Carolina chickadees hop along tree branches searching for insects, sometimes hanging upside down or hovering; they may make short flights to catch insects in the air. Insects form a large part of their diet, especially in summer; seeds and berries become important in winter. They sometimes hammer seeds on a tree or shrub to open them; they also will store seeds for later use. Carolina chickadees commonly make use of feeders.

=== Survival ===
Carolina chickadees are able to lower their body temperatures to induce an intentional state of hypothermia called torpor. They do this to conserve energy during extremely cold winters. In extreme cold weather conditions they look for cavities where they can hide in and spend up to fifteen hours at a time in torpor. During this time they are awake but unresponsive; they should not be picked up and handled at this time because the stress of being held may cause death.

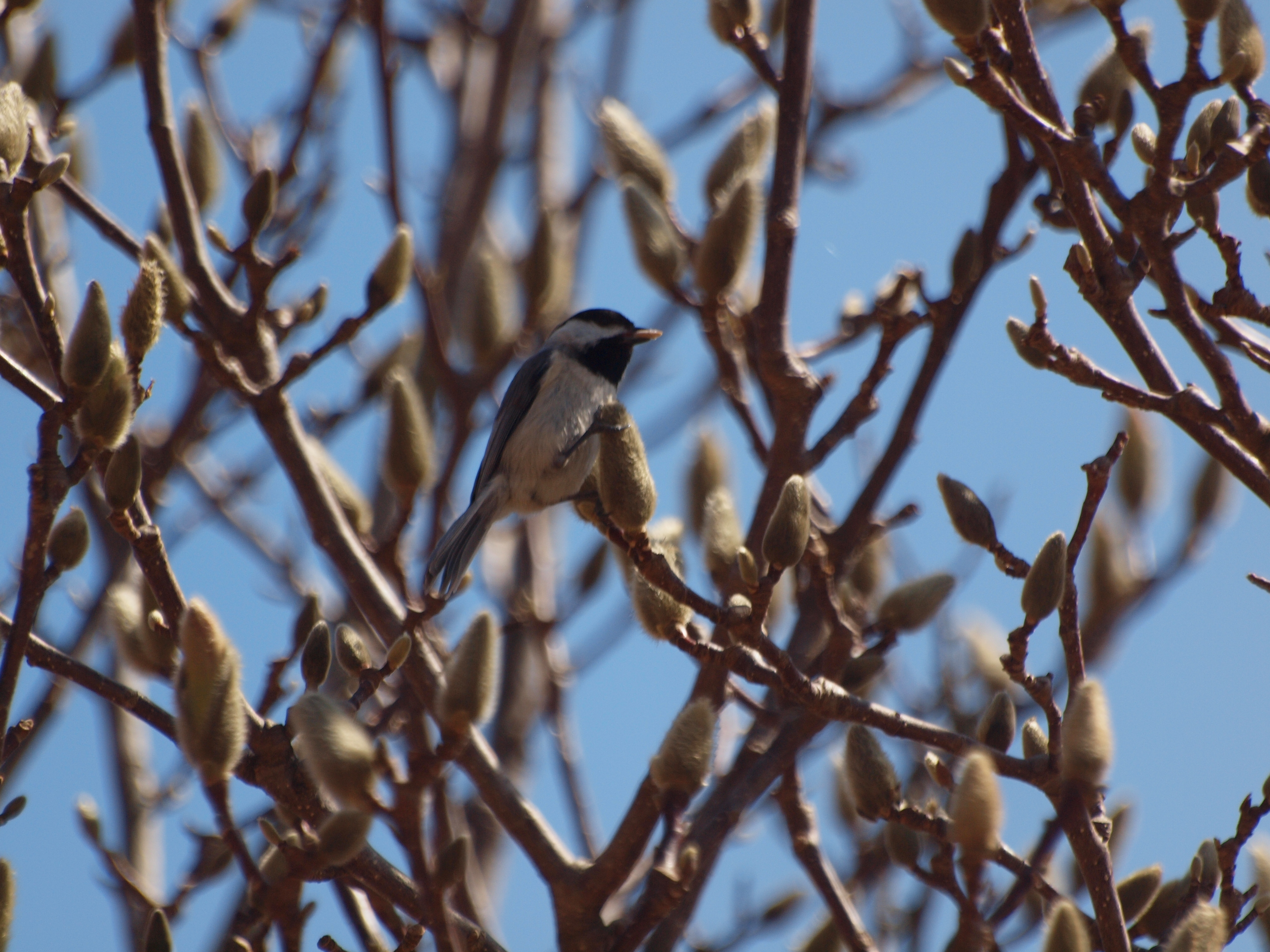
Carolina chickadee on a branch

== In culture ==
The Carolina chickadee is recognized in Native American oral traditions as a news bringer and truth teller. Its presence and song appear in many stories as a harbinger of reconnection with an absent friend, or of impending trouble from a covert adversary. The Carolina chickadee is especially venerated in Cherokee tradition for its role in the defeat of "U`tlûñ'ta, The Spearfinger," a monster and witch whose food was human livers.
