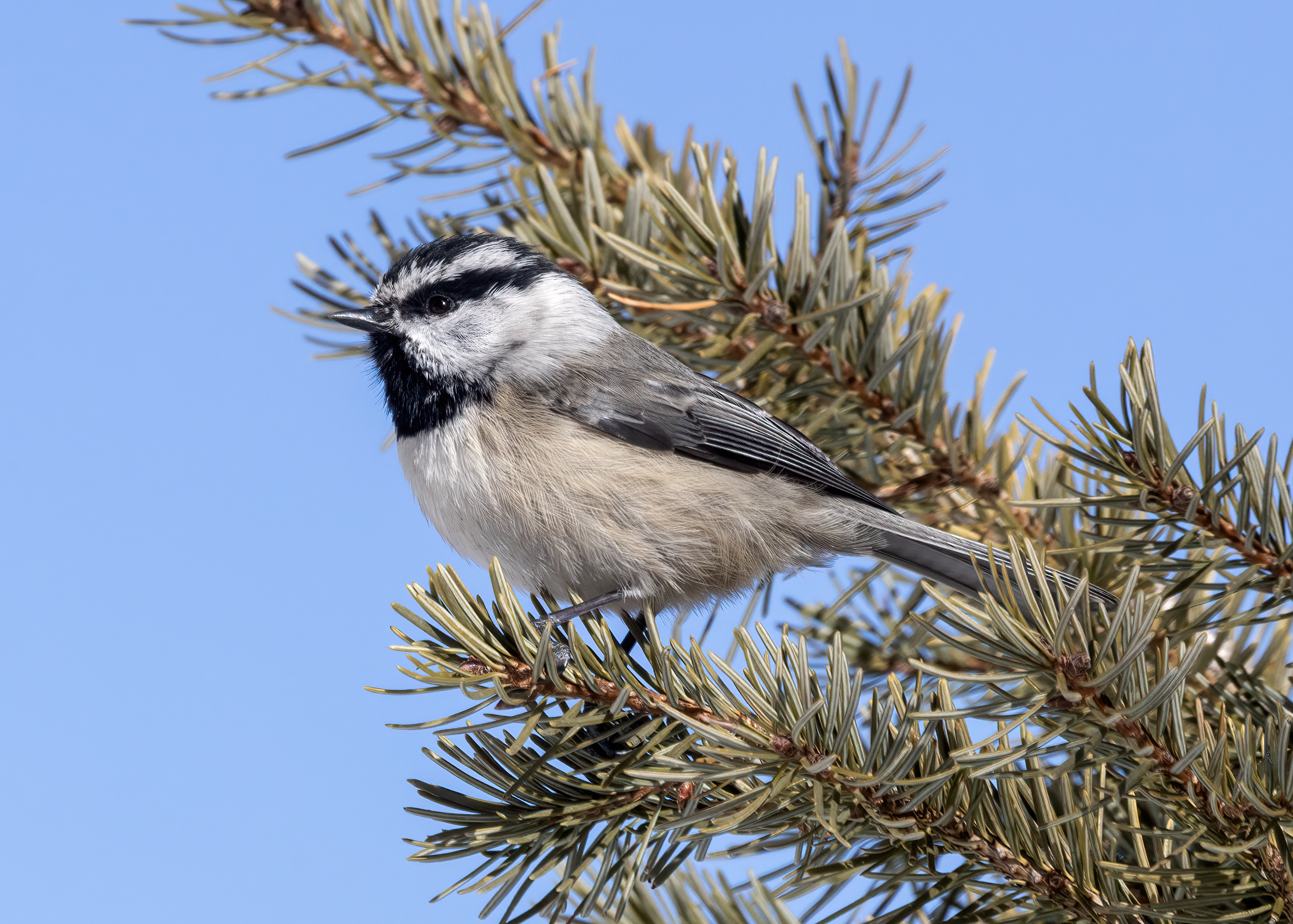

Conservation status
- Least Concern (IUCN 3.1)

Scientific classification
- Kingdom: Animalia
- Phylum: Chordata
- Class: Aves
- Order: Passeriformes
- Family: Paridae
- Genus: Poecile
- Species: P. gambeli

Binomial name
- Poecile gambeli (Ridgway, 1886)
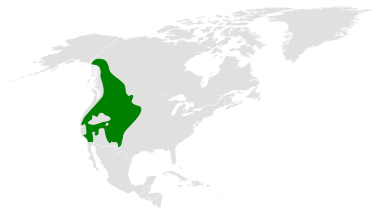
- Range of Poecile gambeli

Synonyms
- Parus gambeli

= Mountain chickadee =

Species of bird

The mountain chickadee (Poecile gambeli) is a small songbird, a passerine bird in the tit family Paridae.

== Taxonomy ==
The specific name honors naturalist William Gambel. The mountain chickadee was formerly placed in the genus Parus with most other tits, but mtDNA cytochrome b sequence data and morphology suggest that separating Poecile more adequately expresses these birds' relationships. Molecular phylogenetic studies have shown that the mountain chickadee is sister to the black-capped chickadee (Poecile atricapillus).

== Description ==
Adults of both sexes have a black cap joining a black postocular stripe behind distinctive white eyebrows. Their backs and flanks are gray and they have paler gray underparts; they have a short black bill, and a black bib. The typical adult wingspan is 7.5 in (19 cm), and the overall length is 5–6 in (13–15 cm). The Mountain Chickadee is one of 55 species of chickadees and tits. The mountain chickadee can be distinguished from other North American chickadees because mountain chickadees are marked with a white line through the side of their black cap, whereas all other North American chickadees have a solid black-cap. Another difference between the mountain chickadee and the 55 other species of chickadees is their location, range, and habitat.

== Distribution and habitat ==
Common inhabitants of the mountainous regions of the western United States and Canada, their range extends from the southern Yukon to California and Rocky Mountain States in the United States. A few mountain chickadees may migrate locally up the mountains in the summer and down into the mountain foothills in the winter, but this phenomenon is not well documented.

== Breeding ==
They breed monogamously, producing 1 to 2 broods per year. In each brood, the average clutch size is 5 to 9 eggs. The eggs are white, but are speckled with a terracotta color. Occasionally, the mountain chickadee will lay an egg without any terracotta color. Incubation by the female is 14 days. The young are altricial, and stay in the nest for 21 days while being fed by both parents.

== Nesting ==
Mountain chickadees build their nests in cavities. It is common to find nests of mountain chickadees in wood, but since they cannot burrow into wood that is not softened, they also build their nests into pockets that are either naturally occurring or previously made by another species. Inside of the nest, the female mountain chickadee builds a seal for entry from resources she gathers, such as fur. This functions as protection for her newly laid eggs when she leaves the nest. She also may use these resources to build insulation for her nest if the crevice is large. The average depth for a mountain chickadee nest falls between 13 and 27 centimeters (5.1 and 11 in). Mountain chickadees also may use a nest for multiple years. Mountain chickadee populations are often limited to certain locations which have good nesting sites and many cavities for inhabiting.

== Diet ==
Their primary diet is insects during the summer and breeding season; conifer seeds and other plant seeds are taken throughout the year. They cling to the undersides of branches and to tree trunks, searching for food in the bark or breaking seeds open by hammering them with their beaks. Mountain chickadees also eat a wide variety of insects. These insects include caterpillars, beetles, insect eggs, pupae, and spiders. They spend most of their daylight hours scavenging for food and feeding. Their diet is best categorized as omnivorous, with only 30 percent of their food being plants and the rest insects. Due to their insect-rich diet, Mountain Chickadees help to manage and control insect populations.

== Vocalization ==
Their call is a throaty chick-adee-dee-dee, while their song is a 3- or 4-note descending whistle fee-bee-bay or fee-bee-fee-bee. Their song sounds like it is whistling the word "Cheeseburger". They travel in pairs or small groups, and may join multi-species feeding flocks after breeding season. When mountain chickadees are choosing a male to mate with, they tend to mate with the more dominant male. Males with a loud call and a large body tend to be chosen by females over quieter and smaller males. This makes the mountain chickadee's callings and songs a very important factor in their reproduction.

== Behavior ==
Mountain chickadees live across a wide range of altitudes and ecosystem types in mountainous areas, resulting in varying levels of activity and behaviors like food-caching. There is some evidence that mountain chickadees have spatial cognition with regard to where they have cached food. Individuals in urban areas appear to be able to habituate quickly to novel stimuli, potentially allowing the species to successfully nest in human-dominated environments. Juvenile birds often leave adult groups for summer foraging, but return to flock with older birds in the winter. Recent studies have indicated that in mixed flocks, black-capped chickadees become dominant over mountain chickadees. They are also very active birds, and can be found grasping to small twigs, and often hang upside down.

== Gallery ==
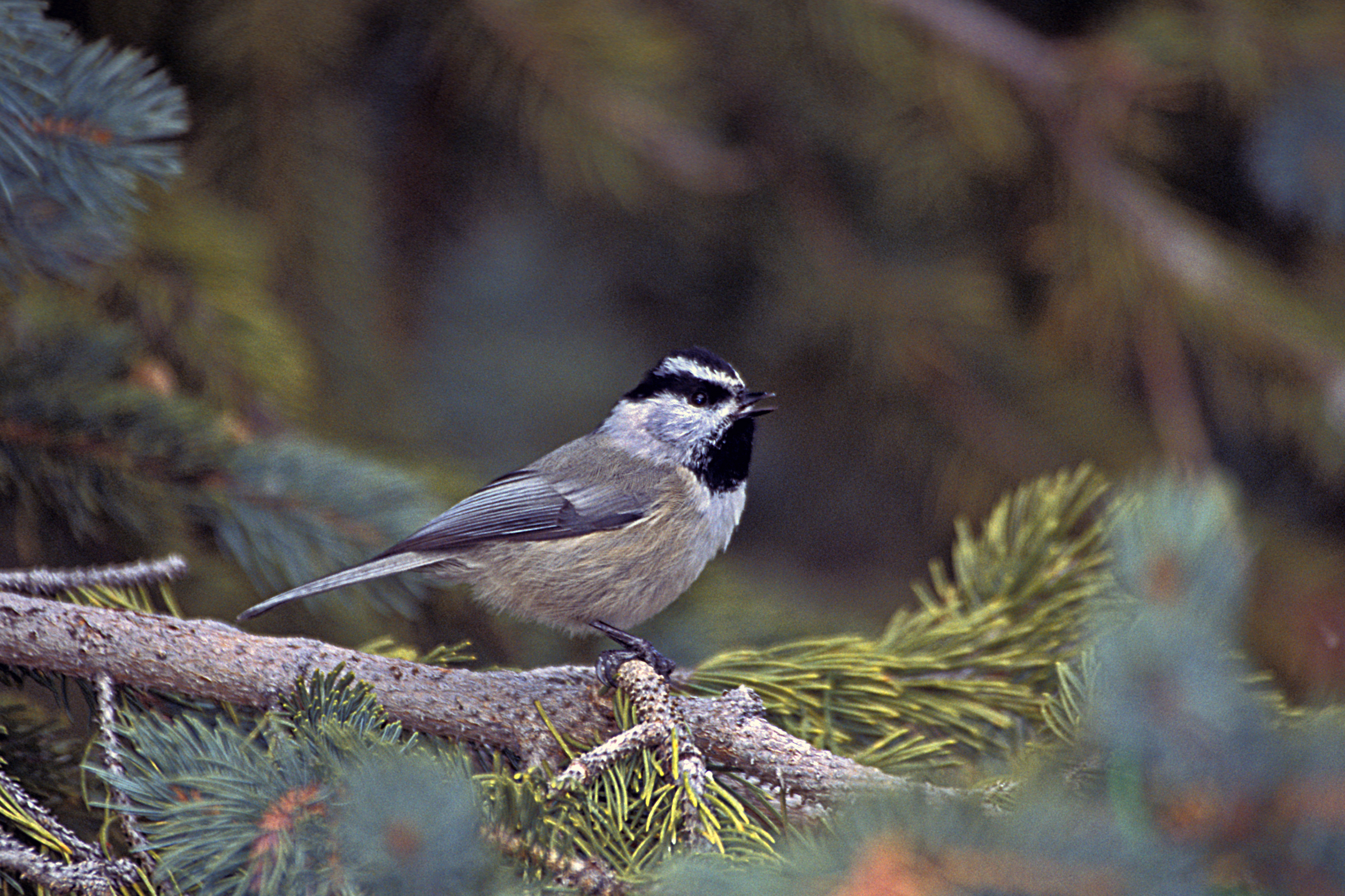

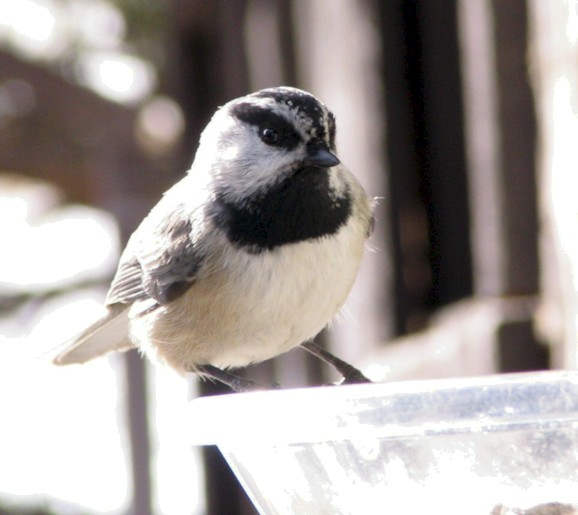

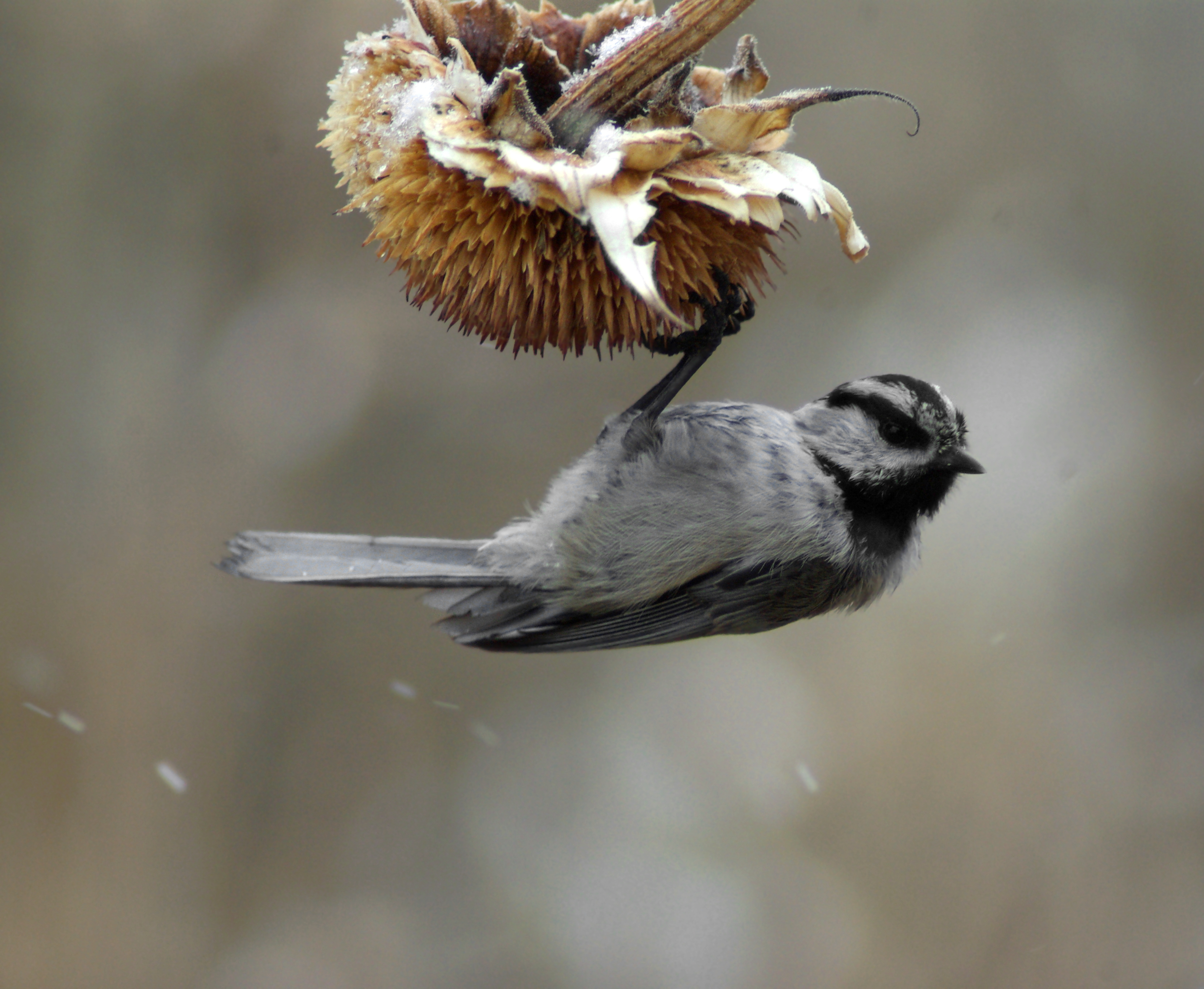

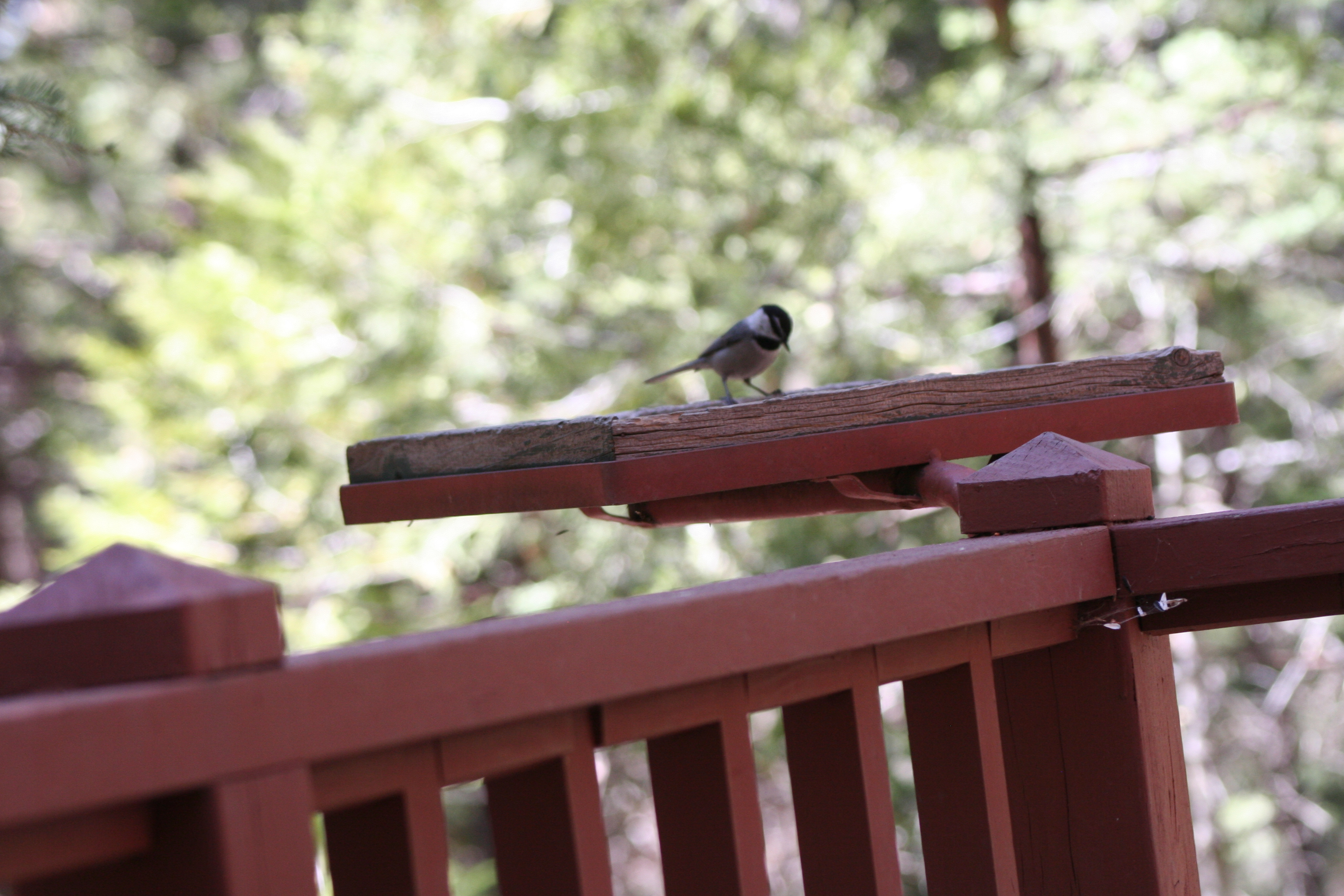

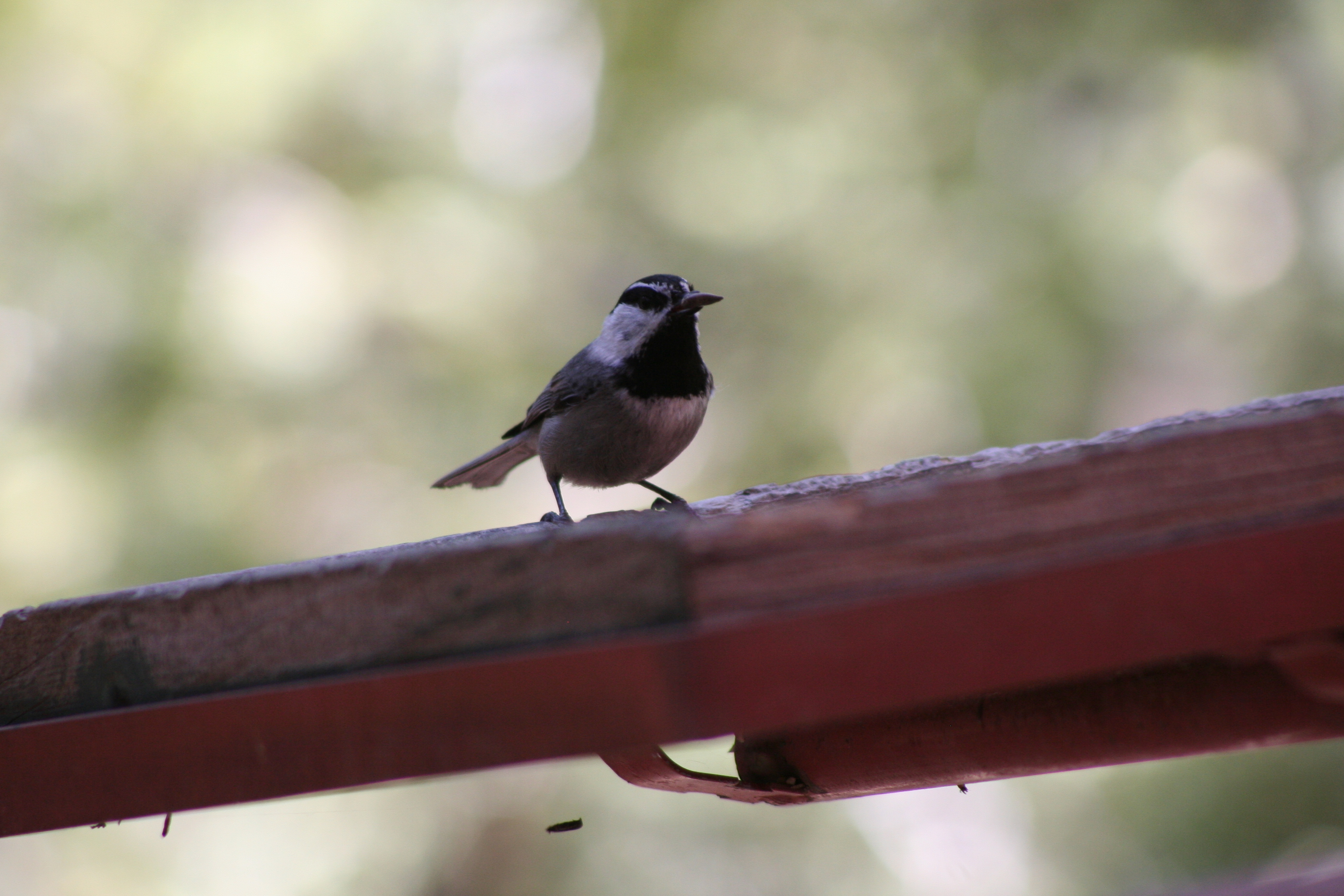
