= Avian keratin disorder =

Bird disease

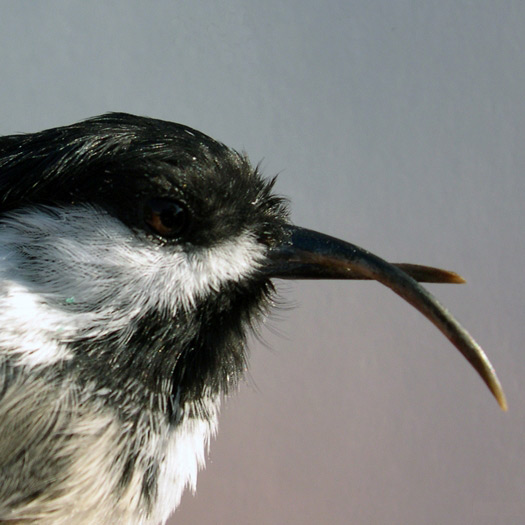
Black-capped chickadee with avian keratin disorder House crow with a curved deformed beak

Avian keratin disorder (AKD) is an emerging disease among wild birds in North America characterized by overgrowth and deformities of beaks. Cases were first observed among black-capped chickadees in Alaska in the late 1990s, and it has spread rapidly since then. The cause of AKD is unknown, but may be Poecivirus, a species of virus within the family Picornaviridae that gained ICTV recognition in 2020.

== Symptoms ==
In AKD, accelerated growth of the keratinized outer layer of the beak (the rhamphotheca) causes elongation and crossing of the mandibles of the beak. This is debilitating and often deadly, as it obstructs the birds' ability to feed and preen themselves, with the resulting dirty and matted plumage unable to play its role in thermoregulation.

One potential secondary symptom is the formation of lesions on various other keratinized tissues. Areas affected include the skin, legs, feet, claws, and feathers. Since AKD is not yet well understood, it has not been determined whether these lesions are strictly a secondary symptom or part of a systemic disorder.

A 2018 study suggests a possible connection between the avian disease Poecivirus and AKD. This study noted that all those affected with AKD also were affected with Poecivirus and suggests Poecivirus may be a possible cause of AKD.

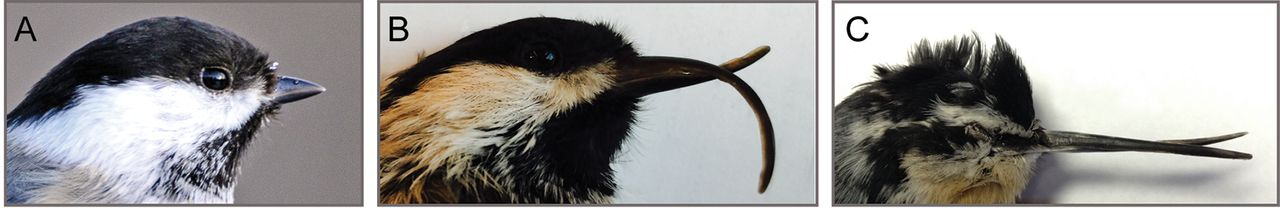
Comparison between a healthy black-capped chickadee, a chickadee with AKD, and a red-breasted nuthatch with AKD.

== Prevalence ==
Initially, AKD was reported in only two species of Alaskan bird, the tree sparrow and a single specimen of the white-winged crossbill. While overgrown and crossed beaks have been identified in upwards of 30 species within Alaska alone, many of those have had only a handful of individuals affected. Other than black-capped chickadees, the species most affected are various corvids, nuthatches, and woodpeckers. In addition, surveys of Northwestern and American crow populations have indicated the possibility of regional clusters of AKD: between 2007 and 2008, the prevalence of AKD across Alaska populations of the Northwestern Crow reached nearly 17%, and up to 36% in the Kenai Peninsula. A 2010 study estimated that in the years between 1999 and 2008 up to 6.5% of Alaska Black-capped Chickadees had bill deformities associated with AKD.
