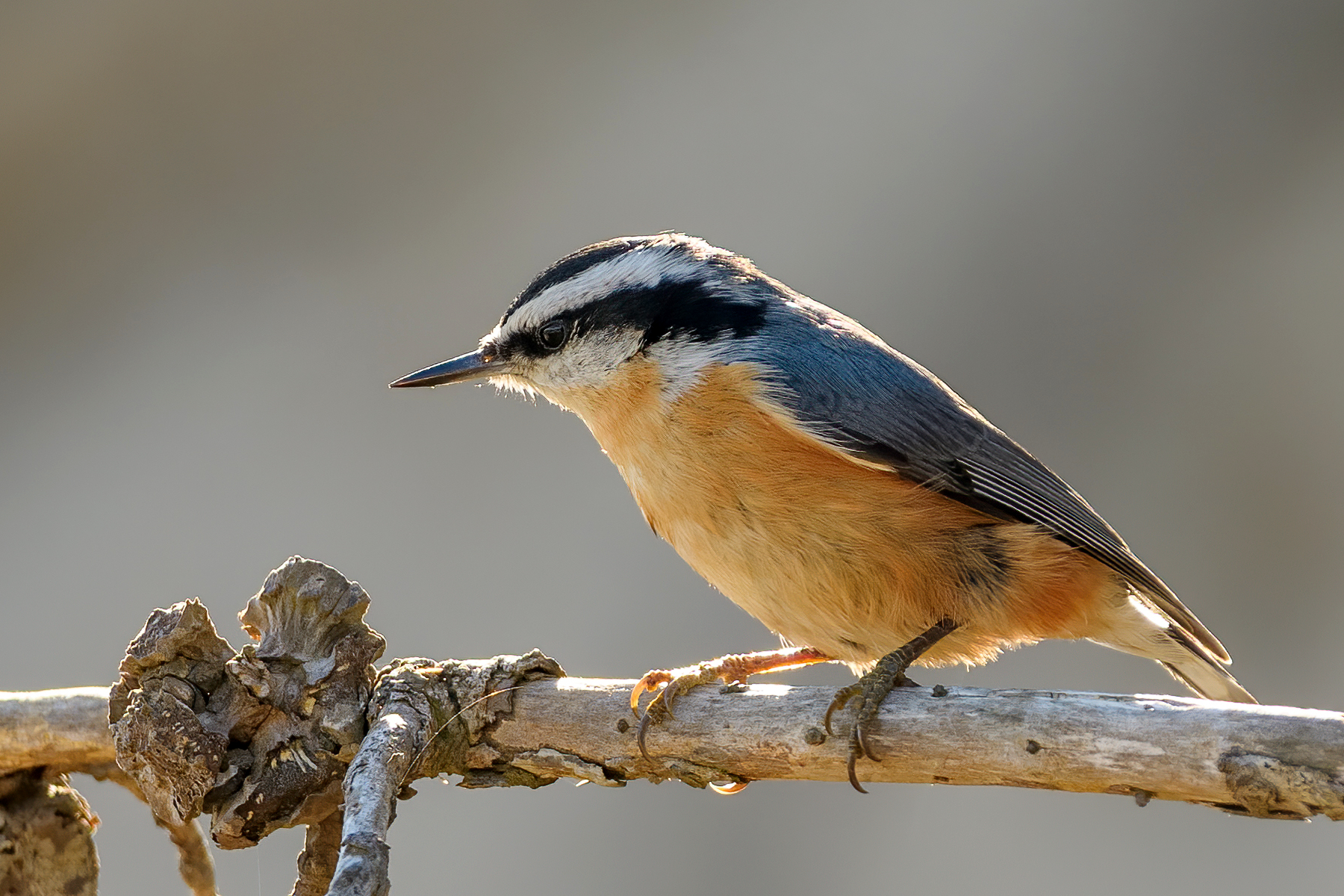
- Male at Point Reyes, California
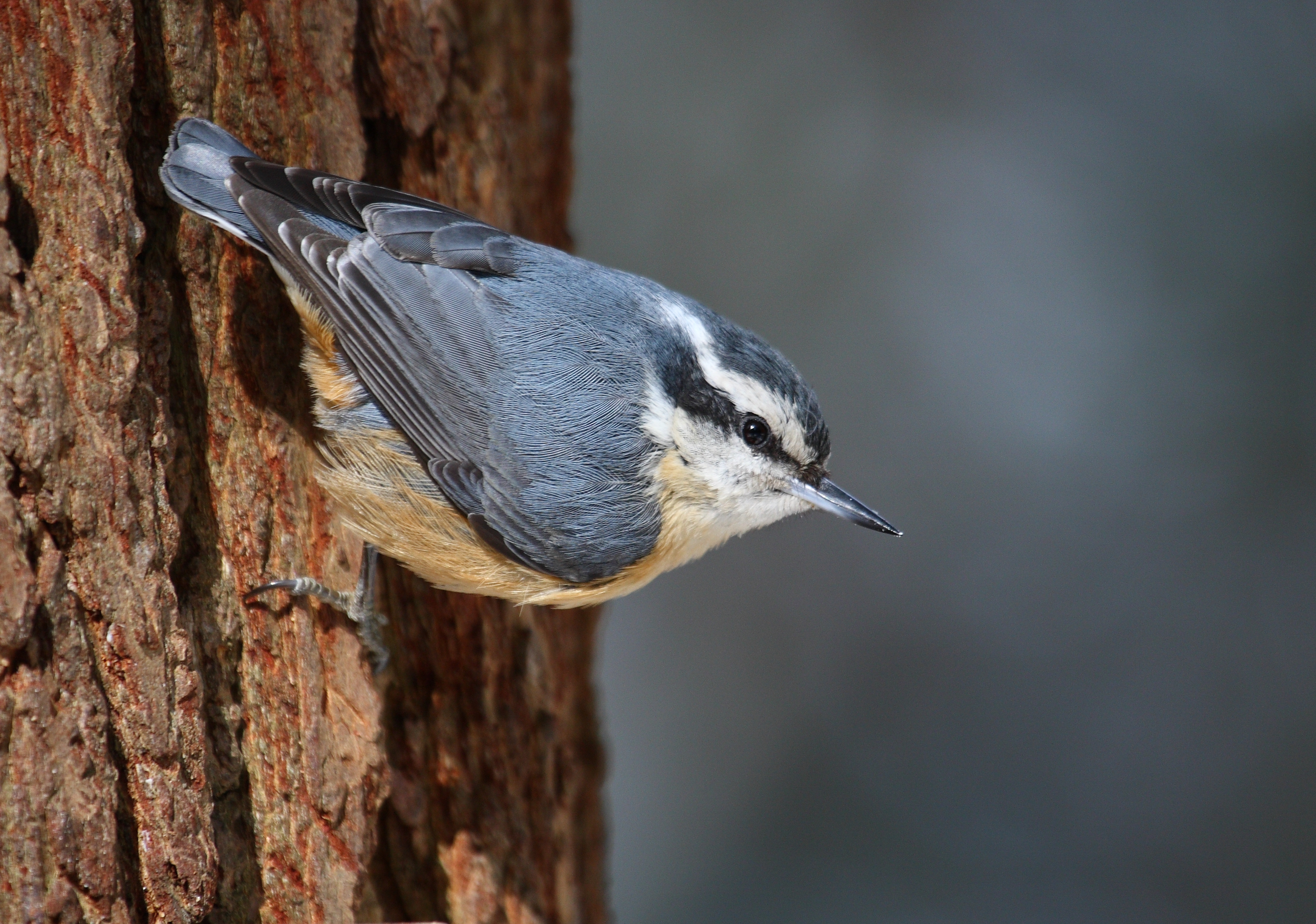
- Female in Quebec, Canada

Conservation status
- Least Concern (IUCN 3.1)

Scientific classification
- Kingdom: Animalia
- Phylum: Chordata
- Class: Aves
- Order: Passeriformes
- Family: Sittidae
- Genus: Sitta
- Species: S. canadensis

Binomial name
- Sitta canadensis Linnaeus, 1766
- Approximate distribution map Year-round Nonbreeding

= Red-breasted nuthatch =

Species of bird

The red-breasted nuthatch (Sitta canadensis) is a small songbird. The adult has blue-grey upperparts with cinnamon underparts, a white throat and face with a black stripe through the eyes, a straight grey bill and a black crown. Its call, which has been likened to a tin trumpet, is high-pitched and nasal. It breeds in coniferous forests across Canada, Alaska and the northeastern and western United States. Though often a permanent resident, it regularly irrupts further south if its food supply fails. There are records of vagrants occurring as far south as the Gulf Coast and northern Mexico. It forages on the trunks and large branches of trees, often descending head first, sometimes catching insects in flight. It eats mainly insects and seeds, especially from conifers. It excavates its nest in dead wood, often close to the ground, smearing the entrance with pitch.

Red-breasted nuthatch

Red-breasted nuthatch

Red breasted nuthatch

Red-breasted nuthatch

Red-breasted nuthatch

== Taxonomy ==
In 1760, the French zoologist Mathurin Jacques Brisson included a description of the red-breasted nuthatch in his Ornithologie based on a specimen collected in Canada. He used the French name Le torchepot de Canada and the Latin Sitta Canadensis. Although Brisson coined Latin names for the species, these usually do not conform to the binomial system and none of them are recognised by the International Commission on Zoological Nomenclature. In 1766, when the Swedish naturalist Carl Linnaeus updated his Systema Naturae for the twelfth edition, he added 240 species that had been previously described by Brisson. One of these was the red-breasted nuthatch. Linnaeus included a brief description and used Brisson's name, Sitta canadensis, as his binomial name.

In the past, the red-breasted nuthatch and four other species, Corsican nuthatch, Chinese nuthatch, Algerian nuthatch and Krüper's nuthatch, were occasionally thought to be a single species. These five make up a well-defined species group known as the "Sitta canadensis group", and are sometimes considered to be a superspecies. Within the species group, DNA studies have shown that the red-breasted nuthatch, the Corsican nuthatch and the Chinese nuthatch make up one clade and the Algerian nuthatch and Krüper's nuthatch make up a sister clade. The red-breasted nuthatch is monotypic across its extensive range.

== Etymology ==
Like all nuthatches, the red-breasted nuthatch is assigned to the genus Sitta (Linnaeus, 1758), a name derived from sittē (σίττη), the Ancient Greek word for the Eurasian nuthatch. The specific epithet canadensis is Neo-Latin for "belonging to Canada". "Nuthatch" is a linguistic corruption of "nuthack", referring to the bird's habit of wedging nuts into cracks in tree bark and hacking at them until they break open. "Red-breasted" is a reference to the rusty colour of the male's underparts.

== Description ==
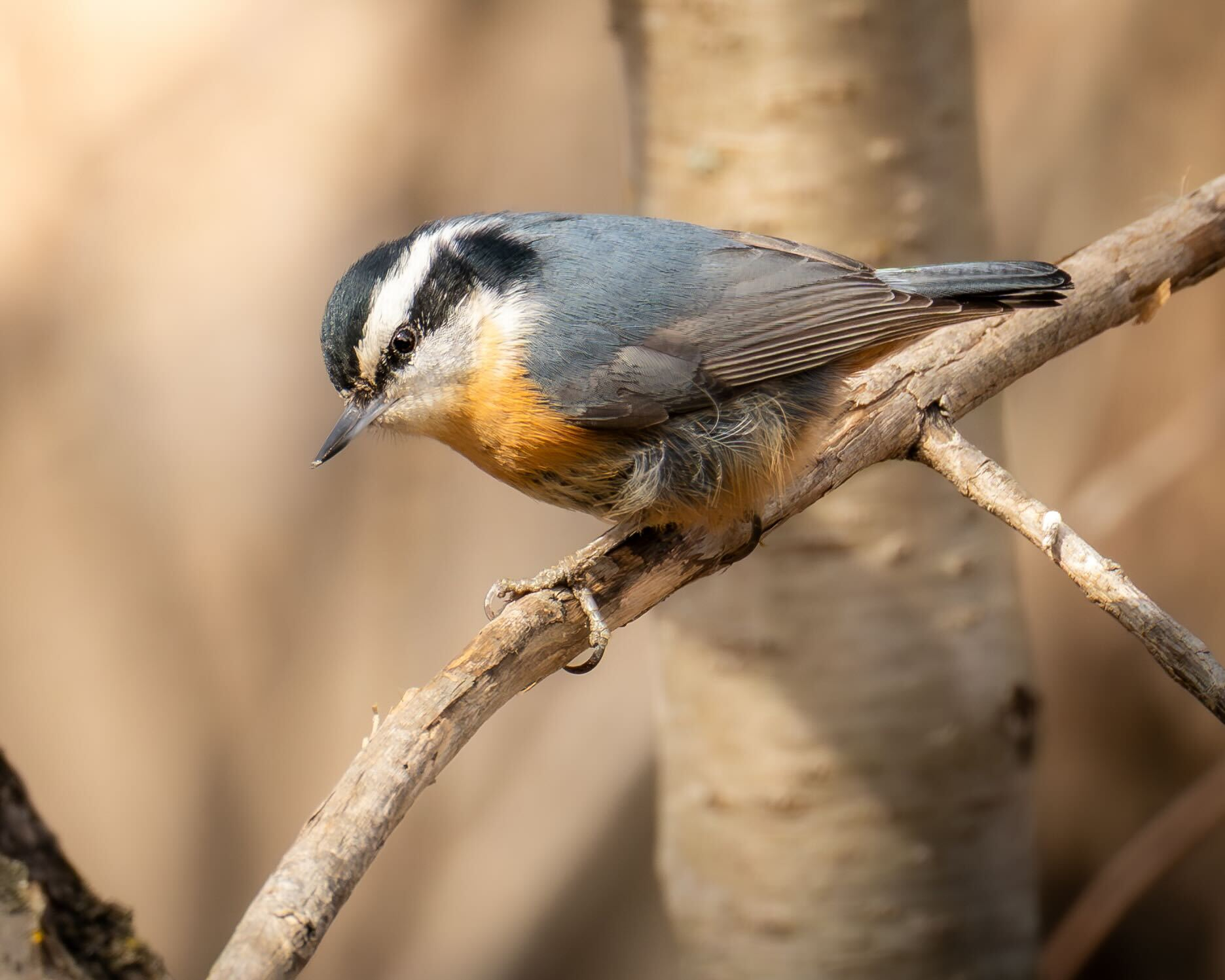
Male in Washtenaw County, Michigan

The red-breasted nuthatch is a small passerine, measuring 4.5 in (11 cm) in length, (Note: By convention, length is measured from the tip of the bill to the tip of the tail on a dead bird (or skin) laid on its back.) with a wingspan of 8.5 in (22 cm) and a weight of 9.9 g (0.35 oz). Its back and uppertail are bluish, and its underparts are rust-coloured. It has a black cap and eye line and a white supercilium (eyebrow). Sexes are similarly plumaged, though adult males are brigher orange below, and conversely females and youngsters have duller heads and paler underparts.

== Voice ==
The red-breasted nuthatch's call is high-pitched, nasal and weak. Transcribed as yenk or ink, they have been likened to a toy tin horn or a child's noisemaker. Its song is a slowly repeated series of clear, nasal, rising notes, transcribed as eeen eeen eeen.

== Habitat and range ==
Though it is primarily a full-time resident of northern and subalpine conifer forests, the red-breasted nuthatch regularly migrates irruptively, with both the number migrating and the wintering locations varying from year to year. They sometimes reach northern Mexico, where they are rare winter visitors to Nuevo León, Baja California Norte and south along the Pacific slope as far as Sinaloa. In the eastern United States, its range is expanding southwards. Though formerly resident on Isla Guadalupe, an island off the western coast of Mexico, it appears to have been extirpated there, with the last known record of the species on the island dating from 1971. There is a single vagrant record for Mexico's Isla Socorro. It is an extremely rare vagrant to Europe, with two records in the western Palearctic; one bird successfully overwintered in eastern England.

== Feeding behaviour and diet ==
Like all nuthatches, the red-breasted nuthatch is an acrobatic species, hitching itself up and down tree trunks and branches to look for food. It goes headfirst when climbing down. It can "walk" on the underside of branches. Unlike woodpeckers and creepers, it does not use its tail as a prop while climbing. It tends to forage singly or in pairs.

The red-breasted nuthatch's diet changes depending on the season. In the summer, it eats mostly insects, occasionally even flycatching, while in the winter, it switches to conifer seeds. At feeders, it will take sunflower seeds, peanut butter, and suet. It often wedges food pieces in bark crevices in order to break them up with the bill (as opposed to holding the food in their feet, like the black-capped chickadee does).

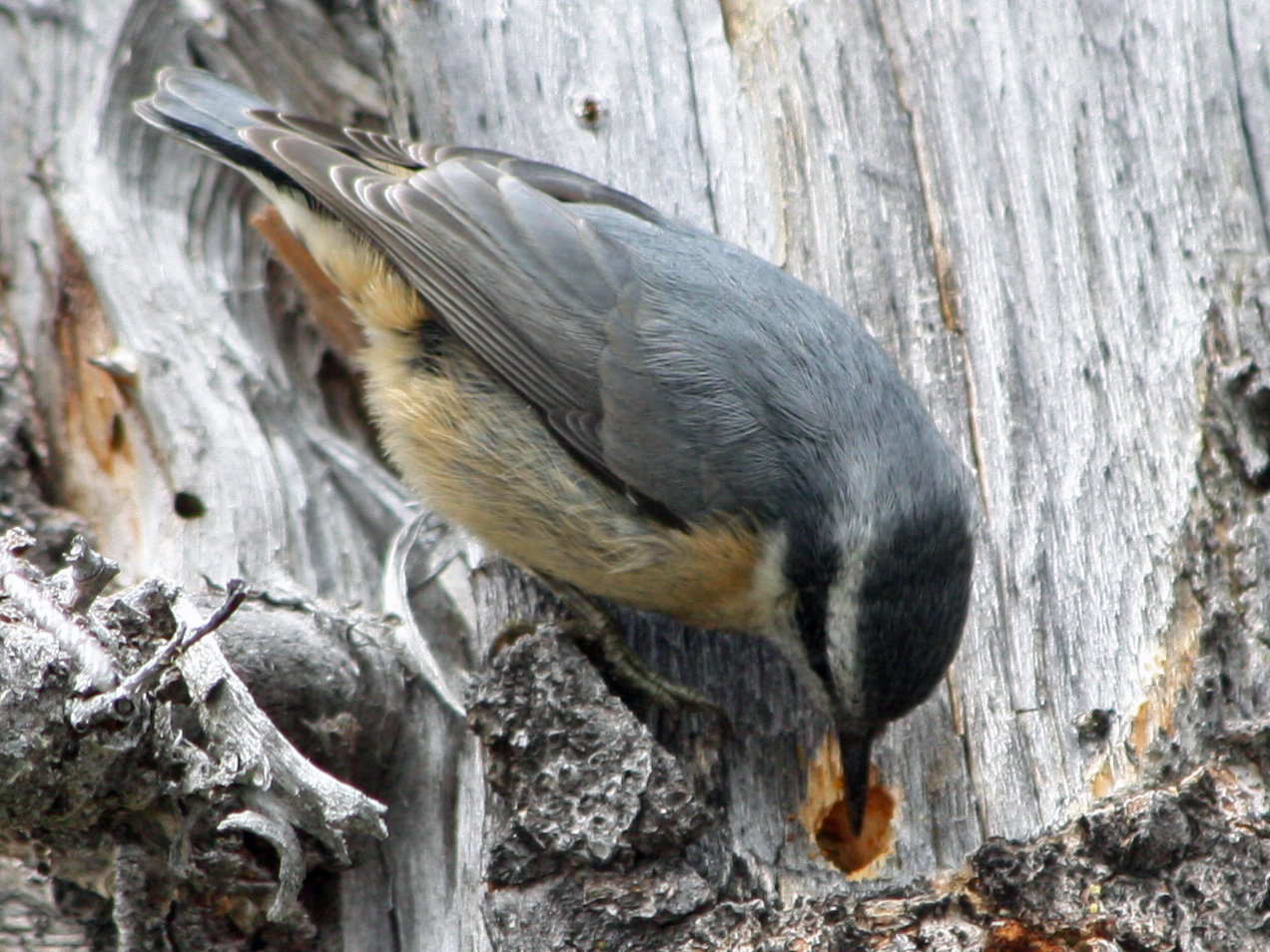
The nuthatch's habit of wedging seeds into cracks and hammering them open has given rise to its common name.

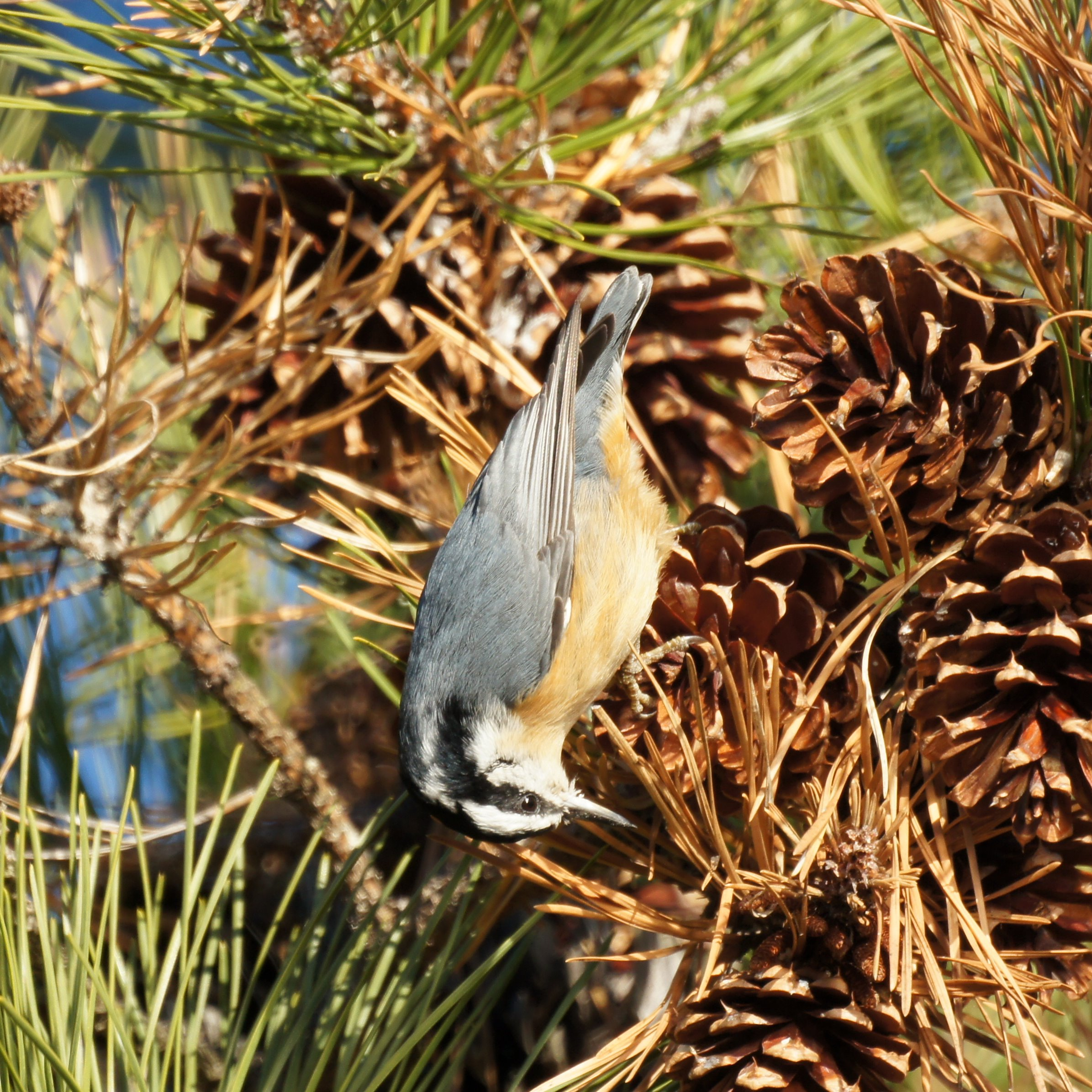
Pine seeds (here, Pinus rigida) are an important component of the diet. Clinton Township, New Jersey.

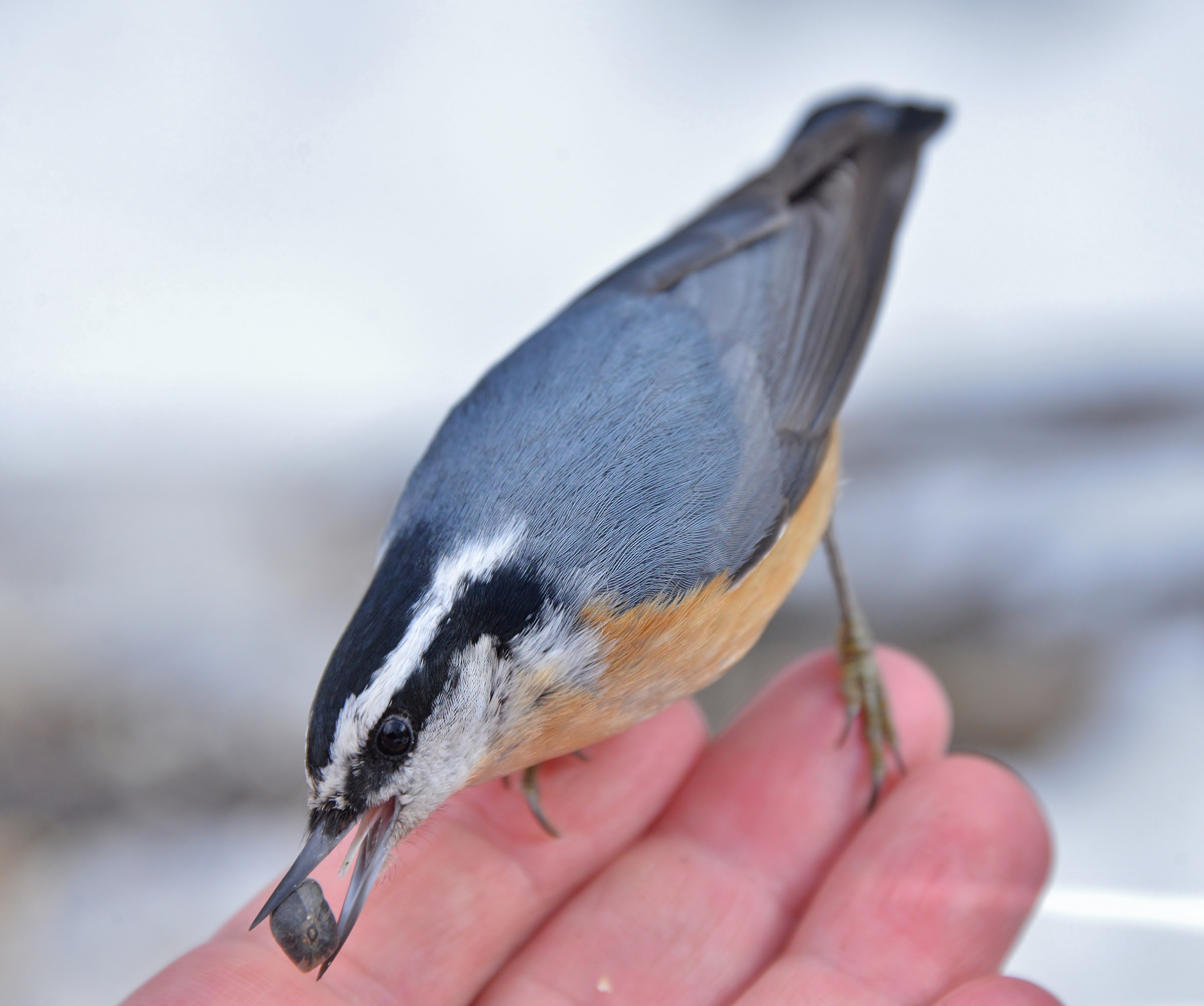
Red-breasted nuthatches are often very confiding, and will readily take offered food from human hands. Toronto, Canada.

== Breeding ==
The red-breasted nuthatch, like all nuthatches, is monogamous. The male courts the female with a peculiar display, lifting his head and tail while turning his back to her, drooping his wings, and swaying from side to side.

This bird excavates its own cavity nest, 1.53–37 m (5.0–121.4 ft) above ground (usually around 4.6 m (15 ft). Excavation is done by both sexes and takes one to eight weeks. The pair smears sap around the entrance hole, presumably to help deter predators. The nest is lined with grass, moss, shredded bark and rootlets. Nest building is done by both sexes, but mostly by females.

The female lays 2–8 eggs (usually 5–6), which are white, creamy or pinkish, and covered with reddish-brown speckles. The eggs measure 0.6–0.7 in (1.5–1.8 cm) long by 0.4–0.5 in (1.0–1.3 cm) wide. Incubation is done by the female and lasts 12–13 days. The young are altricial and stay in the nest for 2–3 weeks, brooded by the female but fed by both sexes. Normally, there is only one brood per year. Lifespan is around 6 years.

== Conservation status and threats ==
Because of its large global range and its increasing population, the red-breasted nuthatch is rated as a species of Least Concern by the International Union for Conservation of Nature. In the Americas, it is protected by the Migratory Bird Treaty Act of 1918.
