= Akdeniz Airlines =

IATA	ICAO	Call sign
-	AKD	AKDENIZ AIRLINES
- Founded: June 1995
- Ceased operations: December 1995
- Fleet size: 3

Akdeniz Airlines was a charter airline from Turkey that operated for a very small period of time during 1995.

== History ==
Akdeniz Hava Yollari, which was the official name for Akdeniz Airlines, was founded in 1995. The airline planned to operate using the Boeing 757 but those could not be acquired so three Airbus A300B4 were used for charter operations. Services began in June 1995 and by December 1995 the airline had ceased operations and all three aircraft were returned to the lessors.
