= Supercilium =

Stripe of plumage on a bird's head

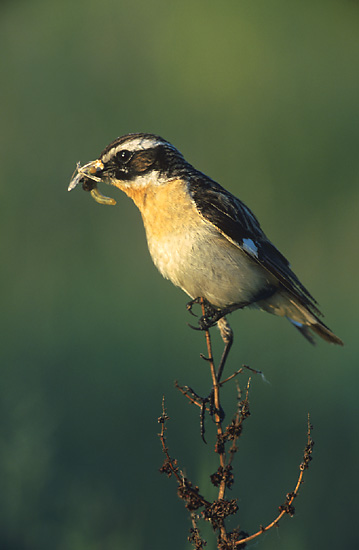
The whinchat has a prominent white supercilium.

The supercilium is a plumage feature found on the heads of some bird species. It is a stripe that runs from the base of the bird's beak above its eye, finishing somewhere towards the rear of the bird's head. Also known as an "eyebrow", it is distinct from the eyestripe, which is a line that runs across the lores, and continues behind the eye. Where a stripe is present only above the lores, and does not continue behind the eye, it is called a supraloral stripe or simply supraloral. On most species that display a supercilium, it is paler than the adjacent feather tracts.

The colour, shape, or other features of the supercilium can be useful in bird identification. For example, the supercilium of the dusky warbler, an Old World warbler species, can be used to distinguish it from the very similar Radde's warbler. The dusky warbler's supercilium is sharply demarcated, whitish, and narrow in front of the eye, becoming broader and more buffy towards the rear, whereas that of the Radde's warbler is diffusely defined, yellowish, and broadest in front of the eye, becoming narrower and more whitish toward the rear. The supercilium of the northern waterthrush, a New World warbler, differs subtly from that of the closely related (and similarly plumaged) Louisiana waterthrush. The Louisiana has a bicoloured supercilium, which widens significantly behind the eye, while the northern has an evenly buffy eyebrow, which is either the same width throughout or slightly narrower behind the eye.

A split supercilium divides above the lores. In some species, such as the jack snipe, the divided stripes reconnect again behind the eye. In others, such as the broad-billed sandpiper, the divided stripes remain separate.

A supercilium drop is a feature found on some pipits; it is a pale spot on the rear of the ear coverts, which although separated from the supercilium by an eyestripe, can appear at some angles to be a downward continuation of the supercilium.

== Gallery ==
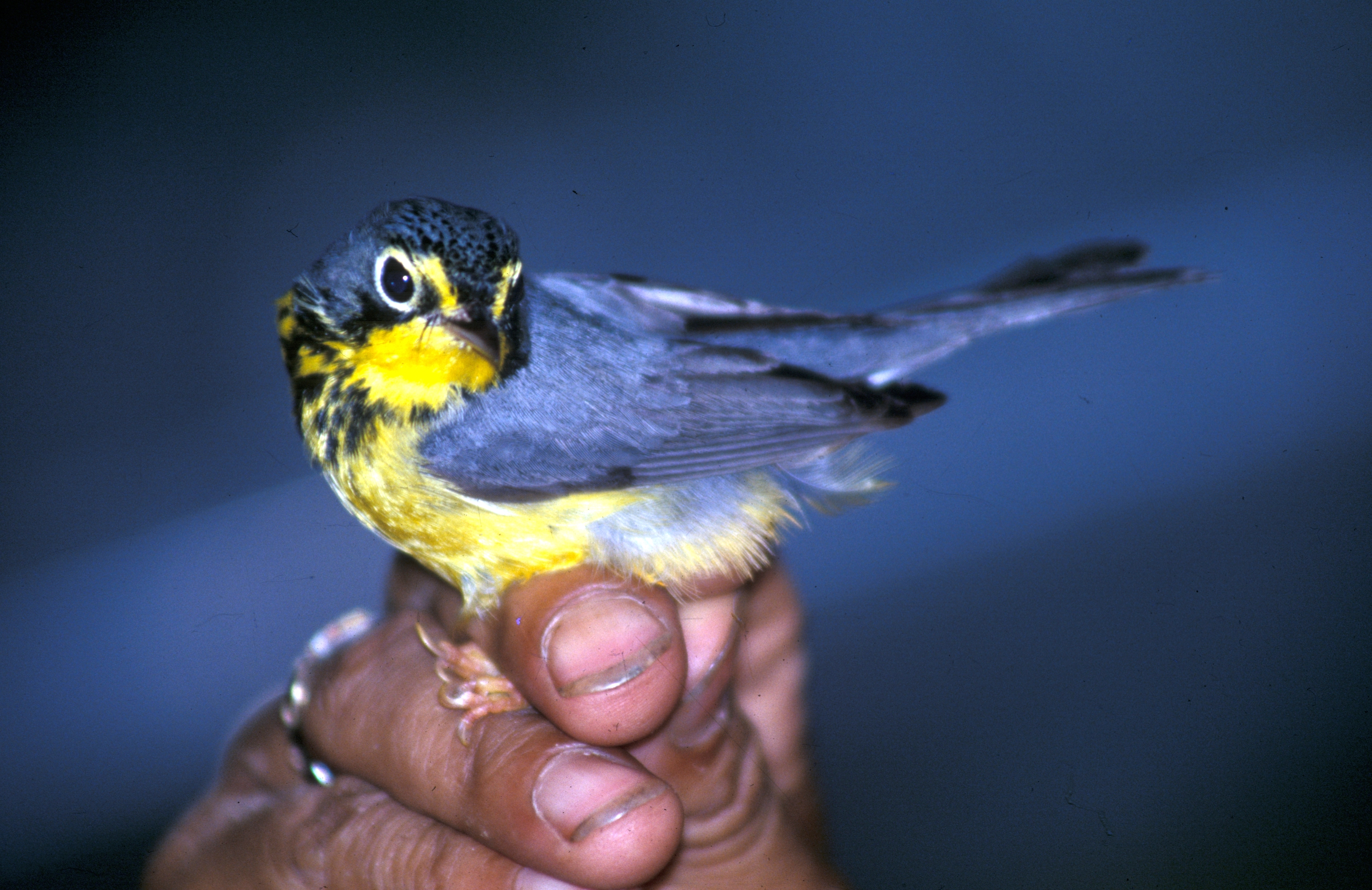
The Canada warbler shows a yellow supraloral.

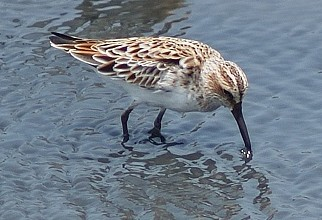
The broad-billed sandpiper has a split supercilium,

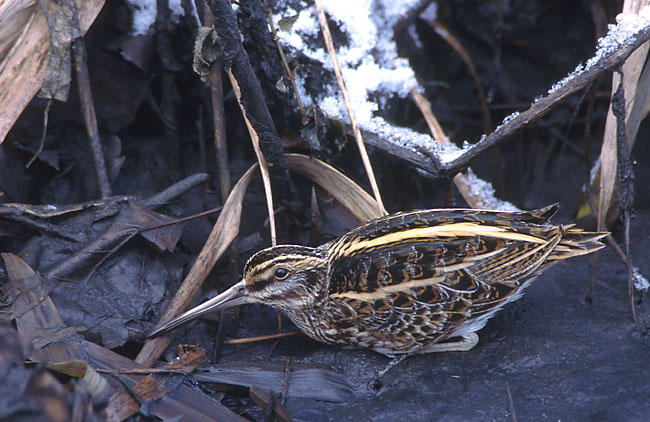
as does the jack snipe.

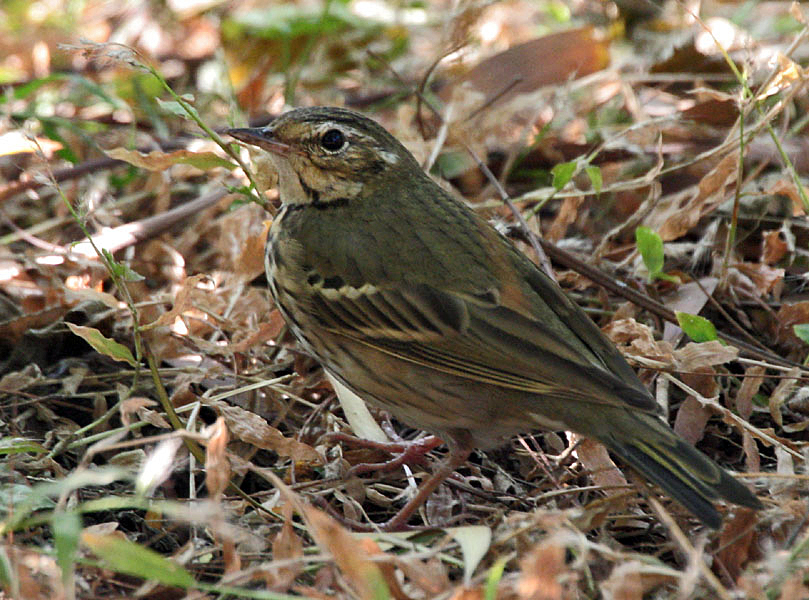
The olive-backed pipit has a supercilium drop.
