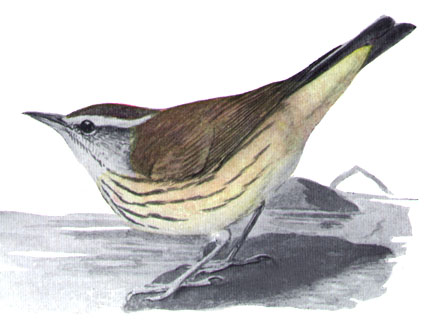
- Louisiana waterthrush (Parkesia motacilla)

Scientific classification
- Kingdom: Animalia
- Phylum: Chordata
- Class: Aves
- Order: Passeriformes
- Family: Parulidae
- Genus: Parkesia; Sangster, 2008

Type species
- Motacilla noveboracensis Gmelin JF, 1789

Species
- Northern waterthrush, Parkesia noveboracensis Louisiana waterthrush, Parkesia motacilla

= Waterthrush =

Waterthrushes

Genus of birds

The waterthrushes are a genus of New World warbler, Parkesia.

The genus was split from Seiurus, which previously contained both waterthrush species and the ovenbird. When the genera split, the ovenbird was the only member left in Seiurus (making it a monotypic genus).

== Taxonomy ==
The genus Parkesia was introduced in 2008 by George Sangster with the northern waterthrush as the type species. The generic name was chosen to honor the American ornithologist Kenneth Carroll Parkes, who was for many years Curator of Birds at Carnegie Museum of Natural History.

== Species ==
The genus contains the following two species.

Genus Parkesia – Sangster, 2008 – two species
Common name	Scientific name and subspecies	Range	Size and ecology	IUCN status and estimated population
Northern waterthrush	Parkesia noveboracensis (Gmelin, 1789)	North America in Canada and the northern United States including Alaska	Size: Habitat: Diet:	LC
Louisiana waterthrush	Parkesia motacilla (Vieillot, 1809)	eastern North America and winters in the West Indies and Central America	Size: Habitat: Diet:	LC
