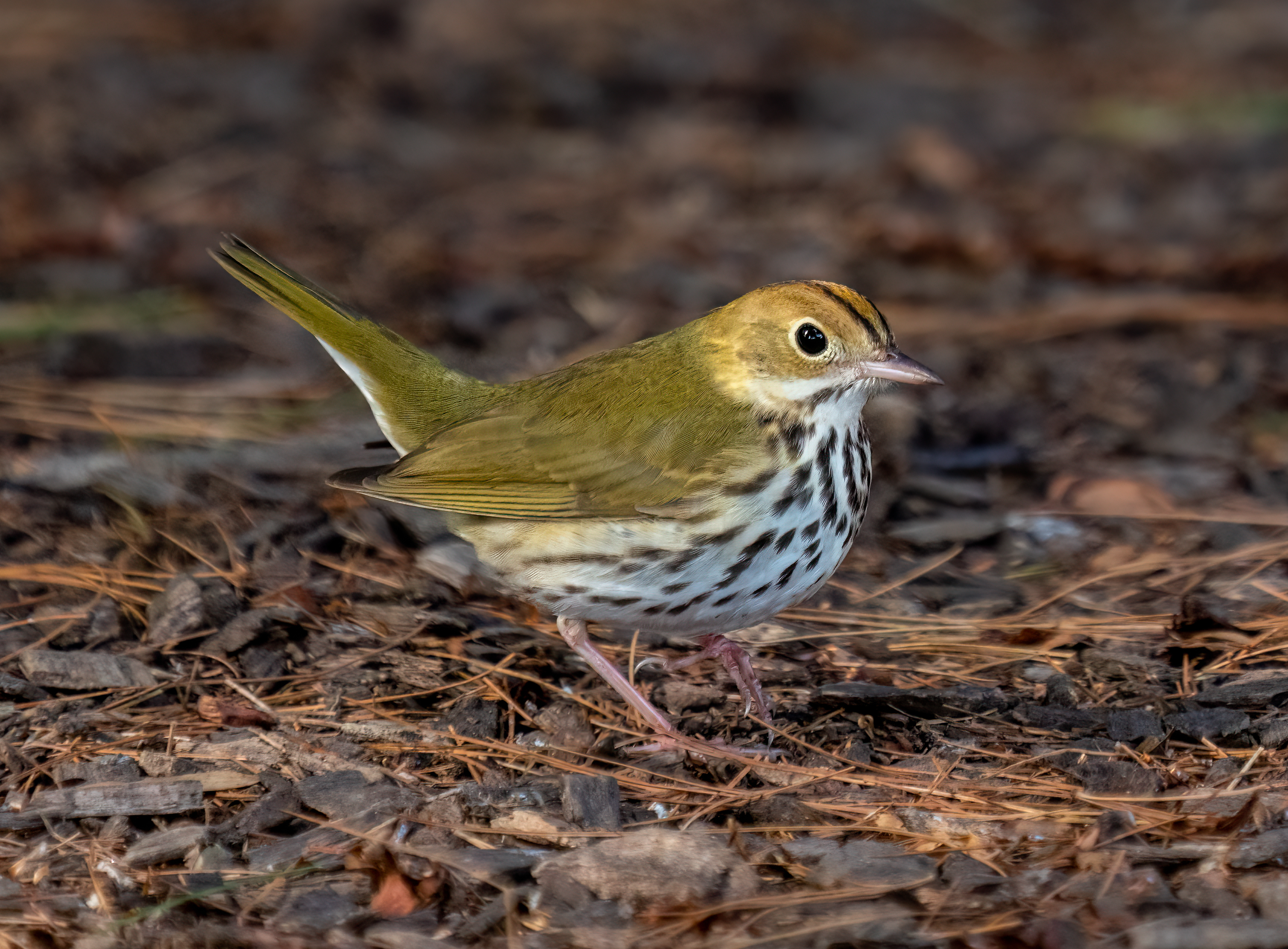

Conservation status
- Least Concern (IUCN 3.1)

Scientific classification
- Kingdom: Animalia
- Phylum: Chordata
- Class: Aves
- Order: Passeriformes
- Family: Parulidae
- Genus: Seiurus; Swainson, 1827
- Species: S. aurocapilla

Binomial name
- Seiurus aurocapilla (Linnaeus, 1766)
- Range of S. aurocapilla Breeding range Wintering range

Synonyms
- Motacilla aurocapilla Linnaeus, 1766; Seiurus aurocapillus

Audio
- Song recorded in Minnesota

= Ovenbird =

Ovenbird Temporal range: Holocene–present

Species of bird

The ovenbird (Seiurus aurocapilla) is a small songbird of the New World warbler family Parulidae. It is the only species placed in the genus Seiurus. This migratory bird breeds in eastern North America and winters in Central America, many Caribbean islands, Florida and northern Venezuela.

Despite its name, it is not in the ovenbird family of birds.

== Taxonomy ==
The ovenbird was formally described in 1766 by the Swedish naturalist Carl Linnaeus in the twelfth edition of his Systema Naturae under the binomial name Motacilla aurocapilla. The specific epithet combines Latin aurum meaning "gold" with -capillus meaning "-crowned". Linnaeus based his entry on "The golden-crowned thrush" that had been described and illustrated in 1758 by the English naturalist George Edwards in his book Gleanings of Natural History. Edwards had been given a specimen that had been collected on a ship off the coast of Hispanola. The ovenbird is now the only species placed in the genus Seiurus that was introduced by English zoologist William Swainson in 1827. Swainson did not specify the type species until a later publication in the same year. The genus name is from Ancient Greek σειουρος/seiouros meaning "wag-tail".

Three subspecies are recognised:

- S. a. aurocapilla (Linnaeus, 1766) – breeds in central, southeast Canada and east USA, winters in north South America
- S. a. cinereus Miller, AH, 1942 – breeds in central west USA, winters in Middle America
- S. a. furvior Batchelder, 1918 – breeds in Newfoundland (southeast Canada), winters in West Indies and east Middle America

The ovenbird is genetically distinct and occupies a basal in the family Parulidae. Before the genetic studies, the waterthrushes were also included in Seiurus but are now placed in a separate genus Parkesia as they are not closely related to the ovenbird.

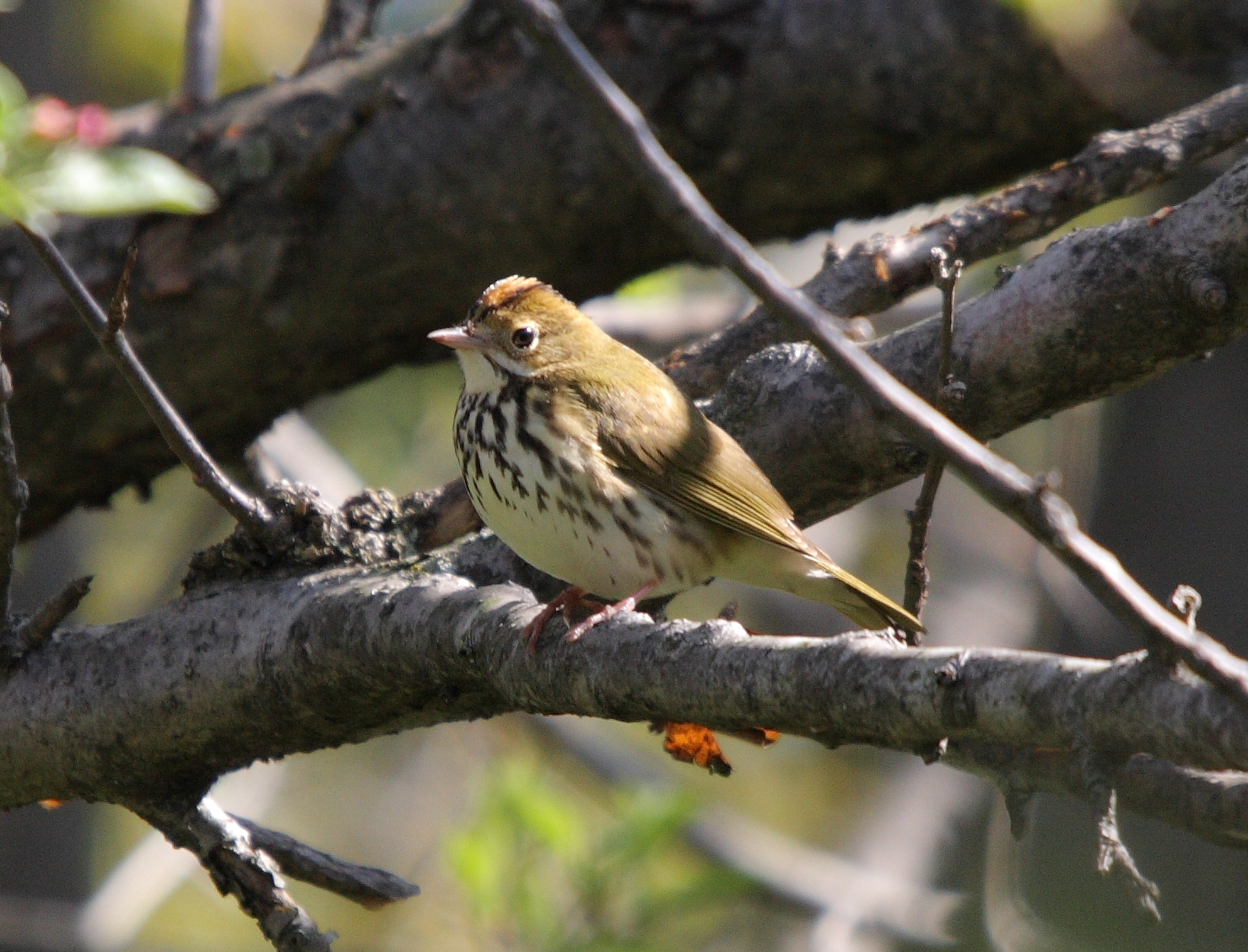
Adult with raised "crest", Léon-Provancher Ecological Reserve, Quebec, Canada

== Description ==
Ovenbirds are large wood warblers and may sometimes be confused by the untrained for a thrush. Adults measure 11–16 cm (4.3–6.3 in) long and span 19–26 cm (7.5–10.2 in) across the wings. They weigh 19 g (0.67 oz) on average, with a range of 14–28.8 g (0.49–1.02 oz). Among standard measurements, the wing chord is 6.8 to 8.3 cm (2.7 to 3.3 in), the tail is 5 to 5.8 cm (2.0 to 2.3 in), the bill is 1.1 to 1.3 cm (0.43 to 0.51 in) and the tarsus is 2 to 2.3 cm (0.79 to 0.91 in). They tend to be heavier in winter and particularly at the start of their migration. They have olive-brown upperparts and white underparts heavily streaked with black; the flanks have an olive hue. A white ring surrounds the eyes, and a black stripe runs below the cheek. They have a line of orange feathers with olive-green tips running along the top of their head, bordered on each side with blackish-brown. The orange feathers can be erected to form a small crest. The eyes and the upper part of the thin pointed beak are dark, while the lower beak is horn-colored and the legs and feet are pinkish.

Males and females look alike. Immature birds have tawny fringes to the tertiary remiges and sometimes buff-tipped outer primary wing coverts. Most conspicuously, the olive-green tips of the crown feathers, which are hardly visible in adult birds, are far larger in extent in immatures and cover the orange crown-stripe almost or completely.

== Distribution and habitat ==
Their breeding habitats are mature deciduous and mixed forests, especially sites with little undergrowth, across Canada and the eastern United States. For foraging, it prefers woodland with abundant undergrowth of shrubs; essentially, it thrives best in a mix of primary and secondary forest. Ovenbirds migrate to the southeastern United States, the Caribbean, and from Mexico to northern South America. The birds are territorial all year round, occurring either singly or (in the breeding season) as mated pairs, for a short time accompanied by their young. During migration, they tend to travel in larger groups however, dispersing again once they reach their destination.

In winter, they dwell mainly in lowlands, but may ascend up to 1,500 m (4,900 ft) ASL e.g. in Costa Rica. The first migrants leave in late August and appear on the wintering grounds as early as September, with successive waves arriving until late October or so. They depart again to breed between late March and early May, arriving on the breeding grounds throughout April and May. Migration times do not seem to have changed much over the course of the 20th century.

This bird is an infrequent vagrant of Europe, with five individuals reported this century on the Azores and a handful of records in Norway, Ireland, Romania, and Great Britain. A live ovenbird on St Mary's, Isles of Scilly in October 2004 was in bad condition, and died despite being taken into care. Ovenbirds are also regular vagrants in California.

== Behaviour and ecology ==
=== Food and feeding ===
Ovenbirds forage on the ground in dead leaves, sometimes hovering or catching insects in flight. This bird frequently tilts its tail up and bobs its head while walking; at rest, the tail may be flicked up and slowly lowered again, and alarmed birds flick the tail frequently from a half-raised position. These birds mainly eat terrestrial arthropods and snails, and also include fruit in their diet during winter.

=== Breeding ===
The nest, referred to as the "oven" (which gives the bird its name), is a domed structure placed on the ground, woven from vegetation, and containing a side entrance. The female usually lays 4–5 eggs speckled with brown or gray. Only the female incubates, for 11–14 days. Young are altricial and are fed by both parents. First flight is at 8–11 days of age.

The placement of the nest on the ground makes predation by snakes, red squirrels, and chipmunks (Tamias) a greater concern than for tree-nesting birds. Chipmunks have been known to burrow directly into the nest to eat the young birds. The female can perform a distraction display, simulating an injured bird, when a potential predator is in the vicinity of the nest.

The ovenbird is vulnerable to nest parasitism by the brown-headed cowbird (Molothrus ater), which is becoming more plentiful in some areas. However, the ovenbirds' numbers appear to be remaining stable. Altogether, it is not considered a threatened species by the IUCN.

=== Vocalizations ===
The main song of the ovenbird is a series of strident, relatively low-pitched, bisyallabic motives repeated without pause about eight times and increasing in volume. Usually, the second syllable in each motive is sharply accented: "chur-tee' chur-tee' chur-tee' chur-tee' chur-TEE chur-TEE chur-TEE!" Males sing this song loudest when broadcast singing and sing more quietly when they are countersinging with a rival male up close. Male ovenbirds also utter a sweet chattering song in the air at twilight, after the manner of the skylark, incorporating portions of the main song into a jumble of sputtering notes and mimicry as they dive back to earth. The call is a variably pitched, sharp "chik!" Some variations recall the common call note of a downy woodpecker. If the bird is excited, it may repeat this call several times. The fight call is a high, rising siiii.

== In literature ==
It is the subject of a poem by Robert Frost, "The Oven Bird", published in his poetry collection Mountain Interval in 1916. Robert Bly also makes reference to "the nimble oven bird" in his short poem "The Slim Fir Seeds".

== Gallery ==
Video of male calling

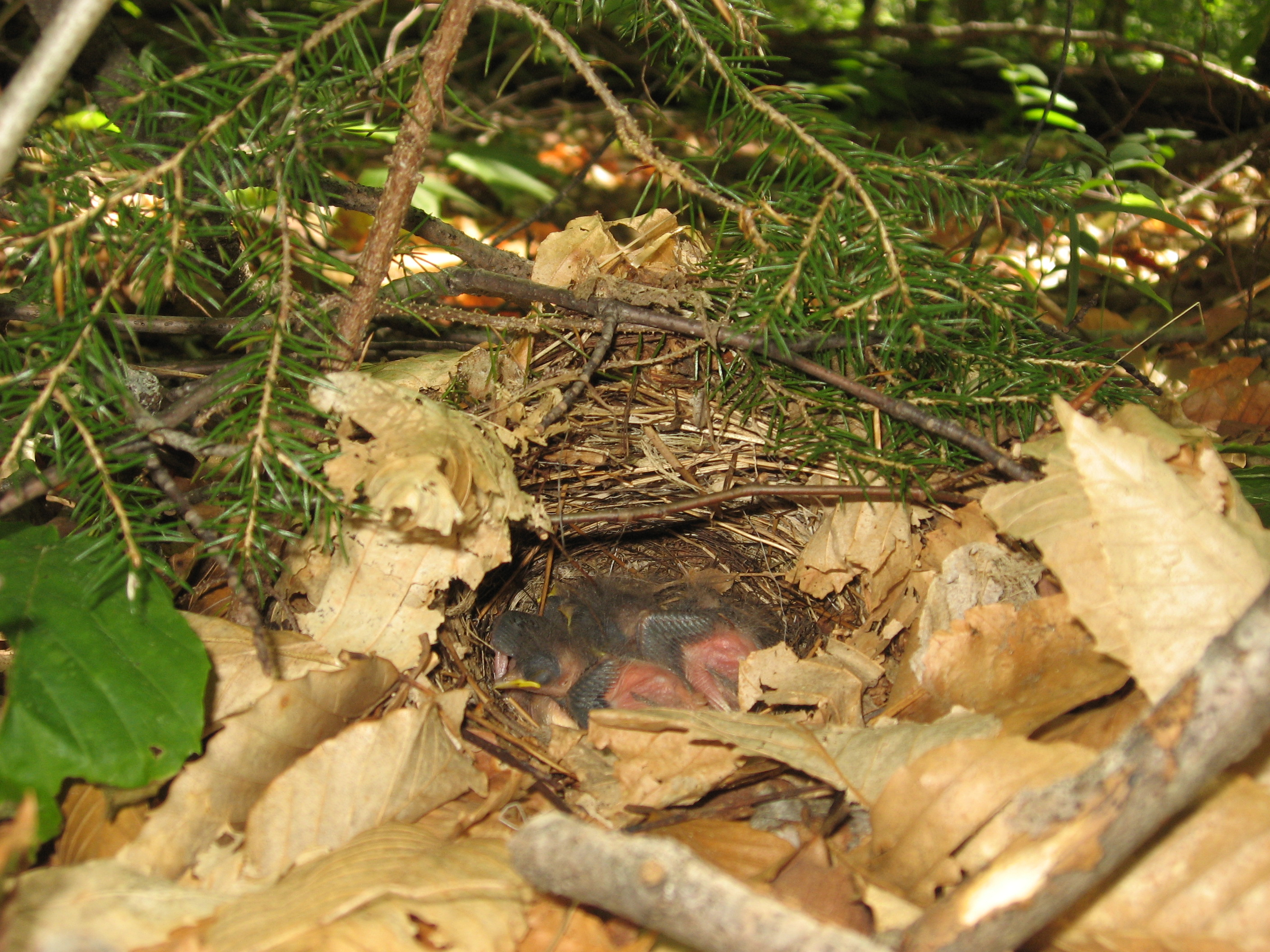
Nest with chicks

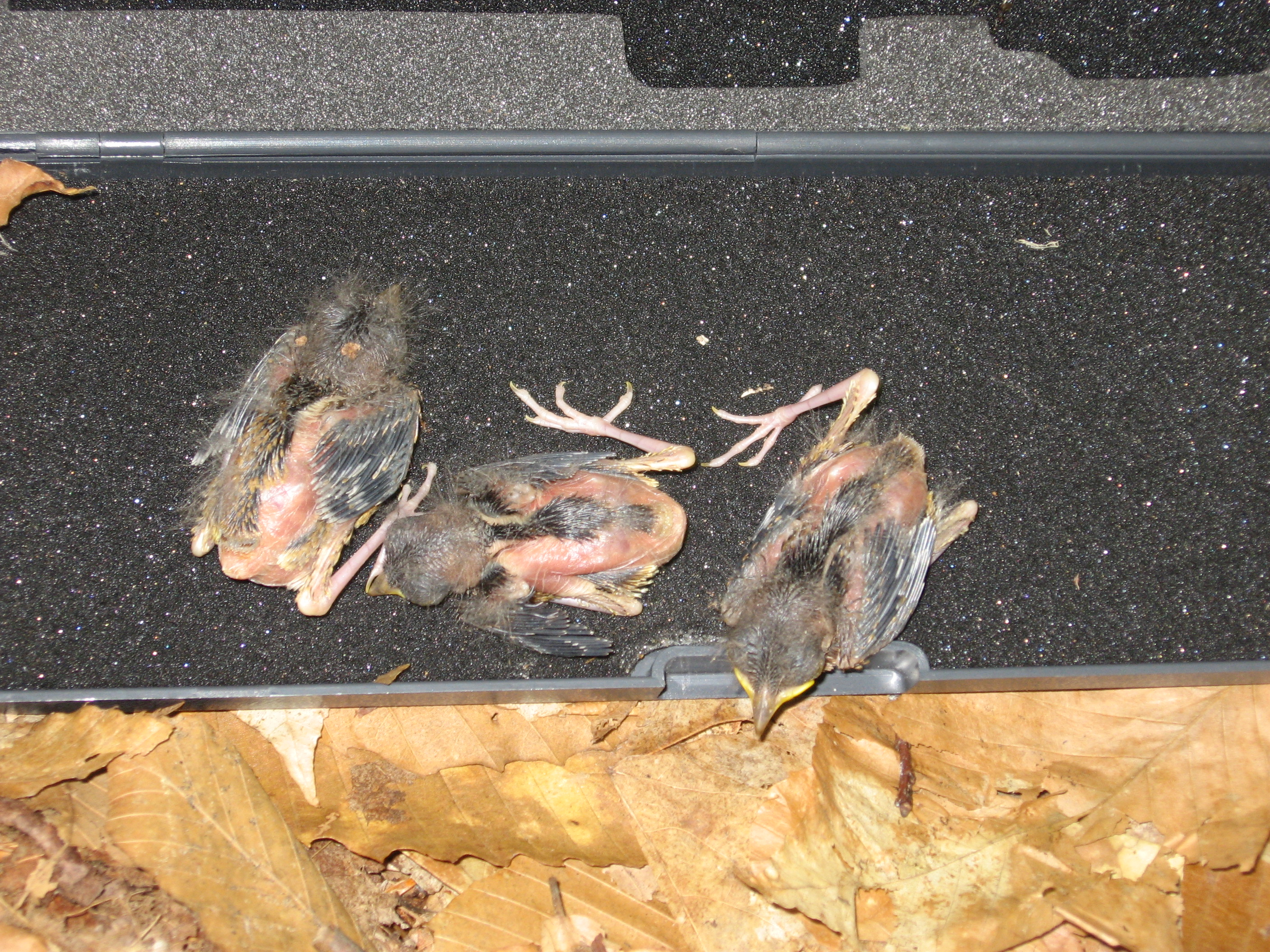
Six-day-old chicks
