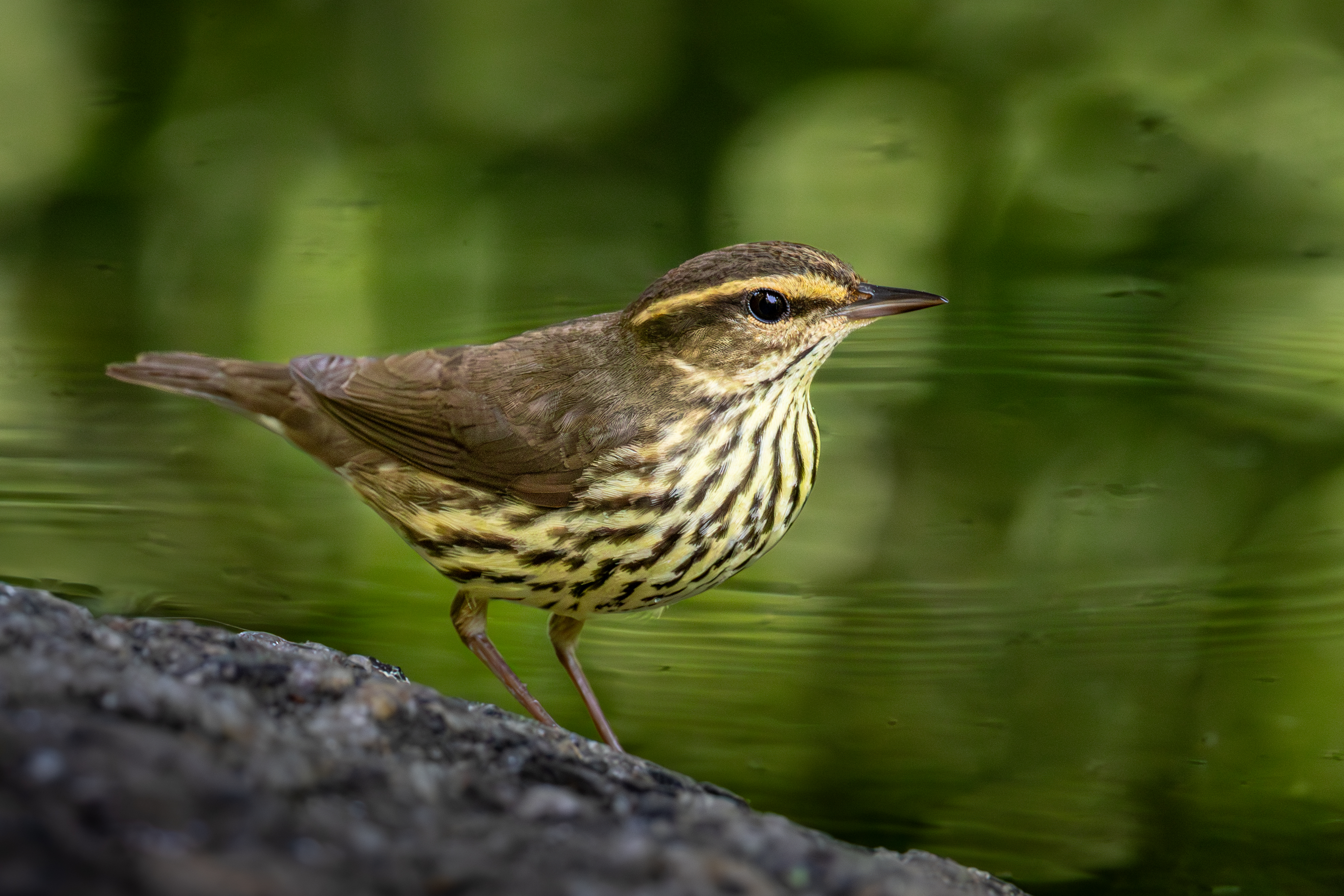
- Northern Waterthrush in Central Park, New York City

Conservation status
- Least Concern (IUCN 3.1)

Scientific classification
- Kingdom: Animalia
- Phylum: Chordata
- Class: Aves
- Order: Passeriformes
- Family: Parulidae
- Genus: Parkesia
- Species: P. noveboracensis

Binomial name
- Parkesia noveboracensis (Gmelin, JF, 1789)
- Range of P. noveboracensis Breeding range Wintering range

Synonyms
- Seiurus noveboracensis

= Northern waterthrush =

Species of bird

The northern waterthrush (Parkesia noveboracensis) is a species of ground-feeding migratory New World warbler of the genus Parkesia. It breeds in the northern part of North America, in Alaska, Canada, and the northern United States; it winters in Florida, Central America, the West Indies, Venezuela, Colombia, and Ecuador. It is a rare vagrant to other South American countries and to western Europe. Its closest relative is the Louisiana waterthrush.

== Taxonomy ==
The northern waterthrush was formally described in 1789 by the German naturalist Johann Friedrich Gmelin in his revised and expanded edition of Carl Linnaeus's Systema Naturae. He placed it with the wagtails in the genus Motacilla and coined the binomial name Motacilla noveboracensis. Gmelin based his account on descriptions of the species by earlier authors, none of whom had coined a binomial name. In 1778 the French polymath the Comte de Buffon had described "La fauvette tacheté de la Louisiane" in his book Histoire Naturelle des Oiseaux. A hand-coloured engraving by François-Nicolas Martinet was published separately to accompany Buffon's text. The species was later described under the name "New York warbler" by the English ornithologist John Latham in 1783 and by the Welsh naturalist Thomas Pennant in 1785. The northern waterthrush is now placed together with the Louisiana waterthrush in the genus Parkesia that was introduced in 2008 by George Sangster. The genus name was chosen to honour the American ornithologist Kenneth Carroll Parkes. The specific epithet noveboracensis is for New York, United States. It combines novus meaning "new" with Eboracum, the Latin name for York, England). Latham had mentioned that the species was "met with in the hedges about New York". The species is considered to be monotypic: no subspecies are recognised.

== Description ==
The northern waterthrush is a large New World warbler (and not a thrush, despite the name). It has a length of 12–15 cm (4.7–5.9 in), wingspan of 21–24 cm (8.3–9.4 in) and weighs between 13 and 25 g (0.46 and 0.88 oz) Among standard measurements, the wing chord is 6.8 to 8.2 cm (2.7 to 3.2 in), the tail is 4.5 to 5.7 cm (1.8 to 2.2 in), the bill is 1.1 to 1.2 cm (0.43 to 0.47 in) and the tarsus is 1.9 to 2.3 cm (0.75 to 0.91 in). On the head, the crown is brown with a white supercilium. The bill is pointed and dark. The throat is lightly streaked brown to black with heavier streaking continuing onto the breast and flanks. The back is evenly brown. Sexes are morphologically similar. Young birds have buff, rather than white underparts. The song of loud, emphatic, clear chirping notes generally falling in pitch and accelerating; loosely paired or tripled, with little variation. Call a loud, hard spwik rising with a strong K sound. The flight call is a buzzy, high, slightly rising zzip.

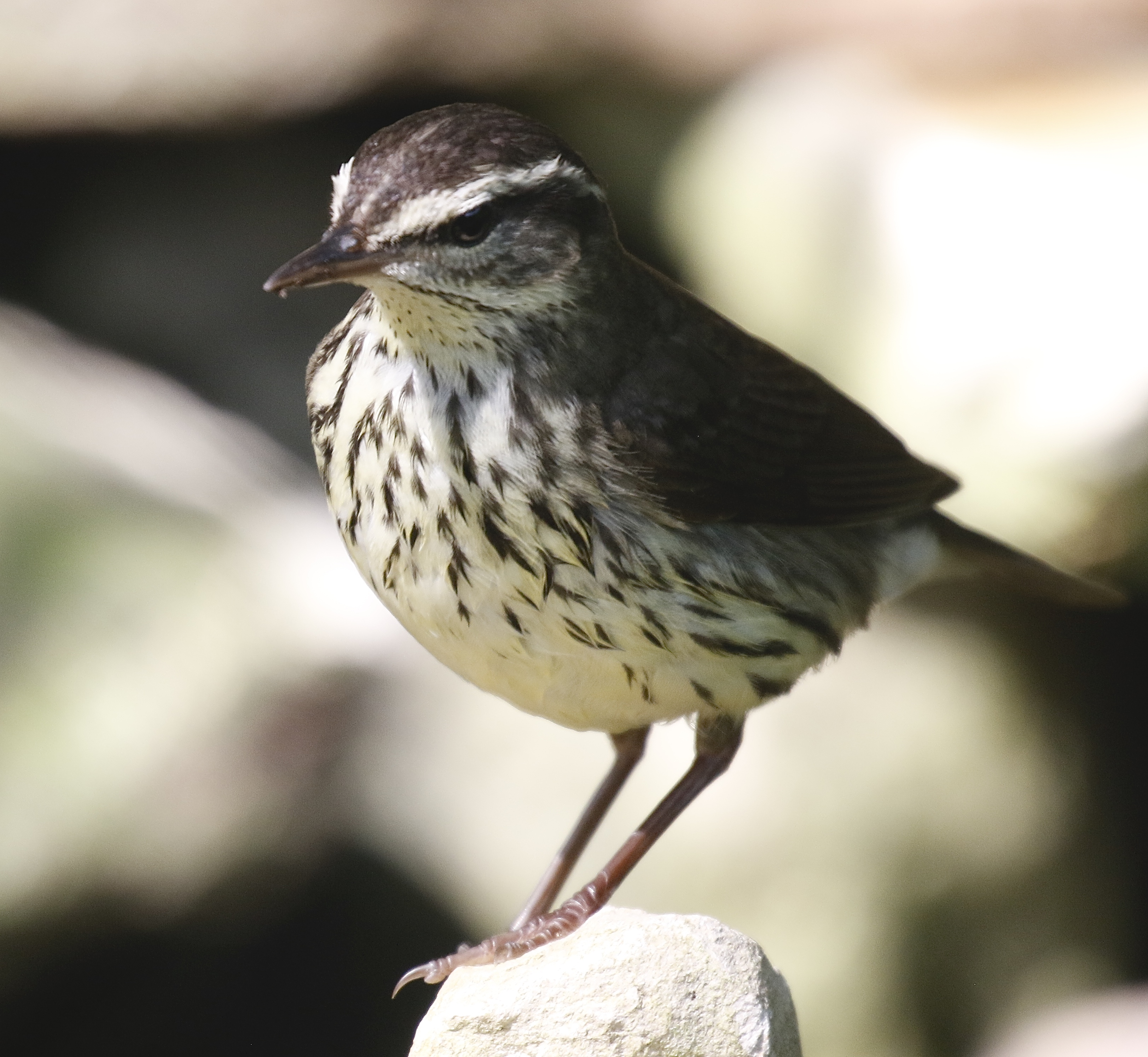
South Padre Island - Texas

The species may be visually confused for the closely related Louisiana waterthrush (Parkesia motacilla), which has buff flanks, a buff undertail, and bright pink legs. The Louisiana waterthrush also has a whiter throat with fewer streaks. More subtle clues include smaller size and smaller bill, a narrower and darker eye-line, and different call note and habits.

Both waterthrush species walk rather than hop, and seem to teeter, since they bob their rear ends as they move along.

== Distribution and habitat ==
Northern waterthrush territories are distributed across both upland and riparian habitats, but have limited occupation of harvested areas. Crowding into riparian buffer zones adjacent to harvested areas have more difficulty foraging compared to those in untouched areas.

On the wintering grounds in Puerto Rico, northern waterthrushes leave daytime foraging areas and fly up to 2 km (1.2 mi) to nighttime roosts. The roosts are often located in red mangrove habitats. Northern waterthrushes winter in 4 main habitats in Puerto Rico: white mangrove, red mangrove, black mangrove, and scrub. Males, which are larger and migrate earlier in spring, prefer to winter in white mangrove, and are able to maintain or gain weight through the winter. Females winter in the other drier and less food-rich habitats. During the non-breeding period, northern waterthrushes are site-faithful and tend to be solitary.

=== Vagrancy ===
The first northern waterthrush recorded in Europe was a female trapped in Ushant, France on 17 September 1955. The species was first recorded in the United Kingdom on 30 September 1958, on St. Agnes, Isles of Scilly. It was caught in a mist-net, photographed, and released, after which it stayed until 12 October. There have been eight recorded sightings in the UK between 1958 and 2024. An exceptional record comes from Antofagasta, Chile.

== Behavior ==
Waterthrushes wintering in red and black mangrove can maintain body weight through the winter but lose weight in scrub. Another determinant in body mass increase in the wintering grounds is moisture.

=== Breeding ===
The breeding habitat of the northern waterthrush is wet woodlands near water, especially rivers and streams. It will occasionally nest in upland areas in the roots of fallen trees. Northern waterthrushes build a cup nest constructed of leaves, bark strips, and rootlets in cavities or among tree roots. It lays three to six eggs, cream- or buff-colored, with brown and gray spots.

=== Food and feeding ===
The northern waterthrush is a terrestrial ground feeder, eating insects, spiders, mollusks (such as snails), worms, and crustaceans found amongst leaf litter, as well as minnows, found by wading through water.

== Gallery ==
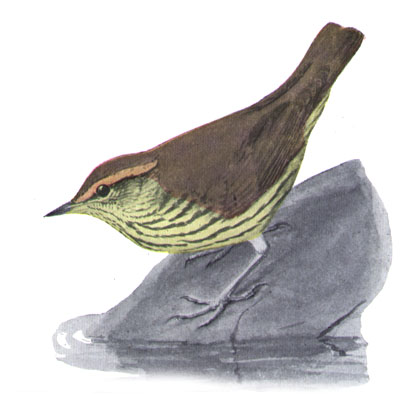
Illustration by Louis Agassiz Fuertes

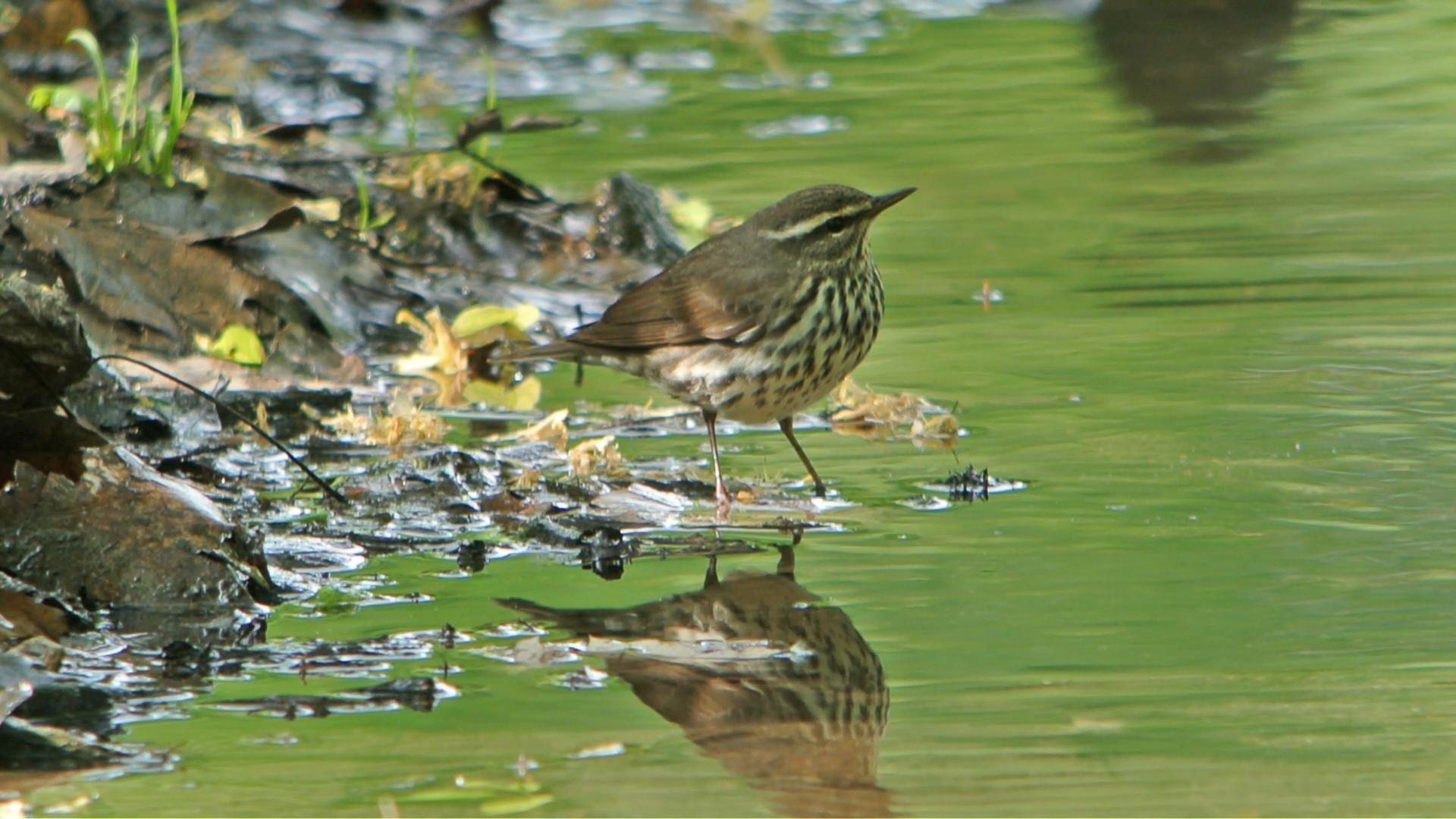
Northern waterthrush with whitish plumage variation

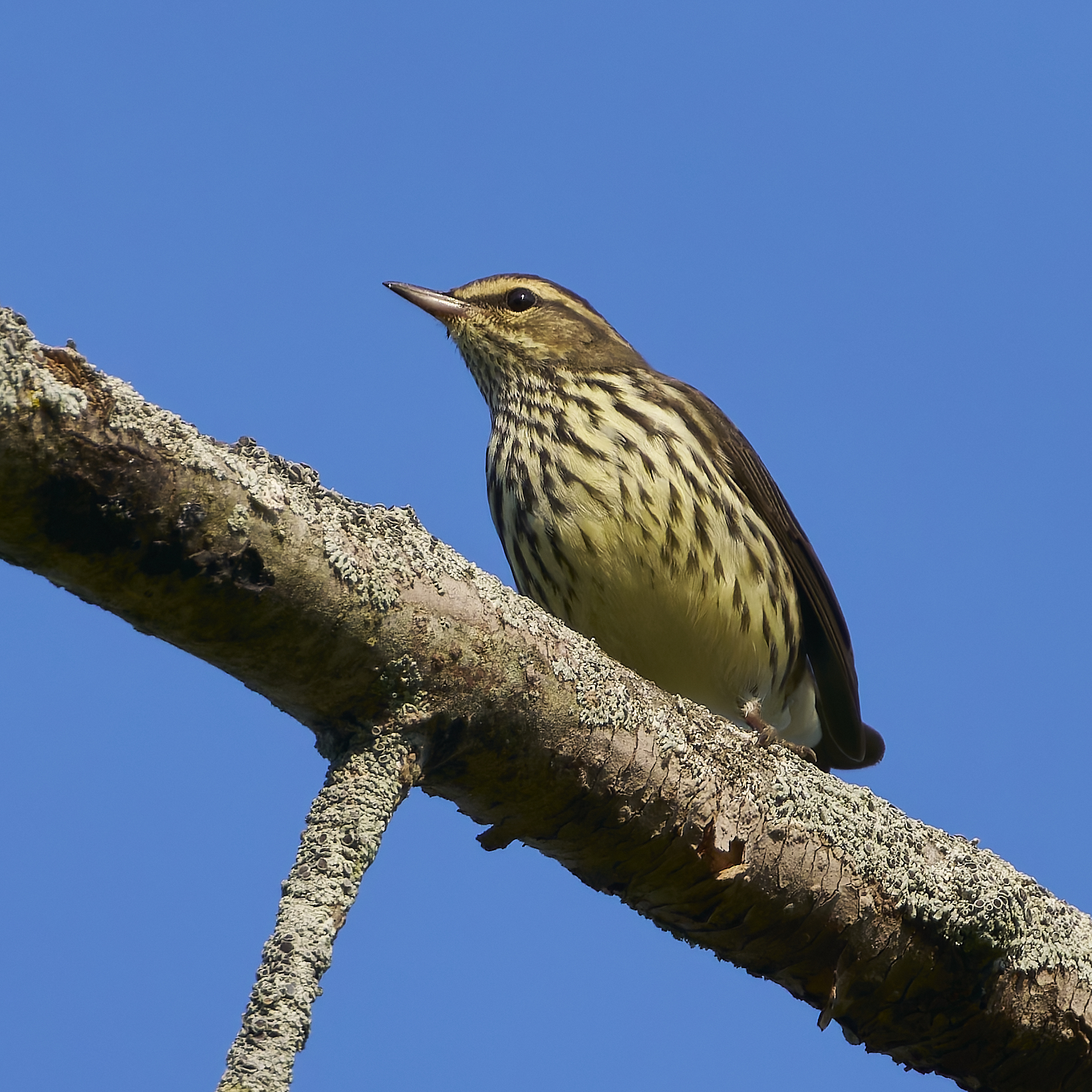
Perched
