= List of birds of Mount Rainier National Park =

This is a comprehensive listing of the bird species recorded in Mount Rainier National Park, which is in the U.S. state of Washington. This list is based on one published by the National Park Service (NPS).

This list is presented in the taxonomic sequence of the Check-list of North and Middle American Birds, 7th edition through the 66th Supplement, published by the American Ornithological Society (AOS). Common and scientific names are also those of the Check-list, except that the common names of families are from the Clements taxonomy because the AOS list does not include them.

This list contains 167 species when taxonomic changes have been made. Unless otherwise noted, all are considered to occur regularly in Mount Rainier National Park as permanent residents, summer or winter visitors, or migrants. The tags below are used to designate the abundance of some species.

- (R) Rare - "usually seen only a few times each year" per the NPS (19 species)
- (U) Uncommon - "likely to be seen monthly in appropriate habitat and season and may be locally common" per the NPS (33 species)
- (O) Occasional - "occur in a park at least once every few years, varying in numbers, but not necessarily every year" per the NPS (Five species)
- (NC) Not confirmed - "Attributed to the park based on weak ("unconfirmed record") or no evidence" per the NPS (21 species)
- (Unk) Unknown (33 species)
- (I) Introduced - a species introduced to North America by humans (Two species; two more that are native to North America were introduced in Washington)

== Ducks, geese, and waterfowl ==
Order: Anseriformes Family: Anatidae

The family Anatidae includes the ducks and most duck-like waterfowl, such as geese and swans. These birds are adapted to an aquatic existence with webbed feet, bills which are flattened to a greater or lesser extent, and feathers that are excellent at shedding water due to special oils.

- Snow goose, Anser caerulescens (NC)
- Canada goose, Branta canadensis
- Wood duck, Aix sponsa (O)
- Blue-winged teal, Spatula discors (NC)
- Cinnamon teal, Spatula cyanoptera
- Northern shoveler, Spatula clypeata (NC)
- American wigeon, Mareca americana (O)
- Mallard, Anas platyrhynchos
- Northern pintail, Anas acuta (U)
- Green-winged teal, Anas crecca
- Ring-necked duck, Aythya collaris (NC)
- Harlequin duck, Histrionicus histrionicus
- Bufflehead, Bucephala albeola (U)
- Common goldeneye, Bucephala clangula (Unk)
- Barrow's goldeneye, Bucephala islandica
- Hooded merganser, Lophodytes cucullatus (Unk)
- Common merganser, Mergus merganser (R)

== New World quail ==
Order: Galliformes Family: Odontophoridae

The New World quails are small, plump terrestrial birds only distantly related to the quails of the Old World, but named for their similar appearance and habits.

- California quail, Callipepla californica (Unk) (Introduced to Washington)

== Pheasants, grouse, and allies ==
Order: Galliformes Family: Phasianidae

Phasianidae consists of the pheasants and their allies. These are terrestrial species, variable in size but generally plump with broad relatively short wings. Many species are gamebirds or have been domesticated as a food source for humans.

- Wild turkey, Meleagris gallopavo (NC) (Introduced to Washington)
- Ruffed grouse, Bonasa umbellus
- White-tailed ptarmigan, Lagopus leucurus (U)
- Sooty grouse, Dendragapus fuliginosus

== Grebes ==
Order: Podicipediformes Family: Podicipedidae

Grebes are small to medium-large freshwater diving birds. They have lobed toes and are excellent swimmers and divers. However, they have their feet placed far back on the body, making them quite ungainly on land.

- Pied-billed grebe, Podilymbus podiceps (NC)
- Western grebe, Aechmorphorus occidentalis (Unk)

== Pigeons and doves ==
Order: Columbiformes Family: Columbidae

Pigeons and doves are stout-bodied birds with short necks and short slender bills with a fleshy cere.

- Mourning dove, Zenaida macroura (NC)
- Band-tailed pigeon, Patagioenas fasciata

== Nightjars and allies ==
Order: Caprimulgiformes Family: Caprimulgidae

Nightjars are medium-sized nocturnal birds that usually nest on the ground. They have long wings, short legs, and very short bills. Most have small feet, of little use for walking, and long pointed wings. Their soft plumage is cryptically colored to resemble bark or leaves.

- Common nighthawk, Chordeiles minor (Unk)

== Swifts ==
Order: Apodiformes Family: Apodidae

The swifts are small birds which spend the majority of their lives flying. These birds have very short legs and never settle voluntarily on the ground, perching instead only on vertical surfaces. Many swifts have very long, swept-back wings which resemble a crescent or boomerang.

- Black swift, Cypseloides niger (Unk)
- Vaux's swift, Chaetura vauxi (Unk)

== Hummingbirds ==
Order: Apodiformes Family: Trochilidae

Hummingbirds are small birds capable of hovering in mid-air due to the rapid flapping of their wings. They are the only birds that can fly backwards.

- Calliope hummingbird, Selasphorus calliope (Unk)
- Rufous hummingbird, Selasphorus rufus (Unk)

== Rails, gallinules, and coots ==
Order: Gruiformes Family: Rallidae

Rallidae is a large family of small to medium-sized birds which includes the rails, crakes, coots, and gallinules. The most typical family members occupy dense vegetation in damp environments near lakes, swamps, or rivers. In general they are shy and secretive birds, making them difficult to observe. Most species have strong legs and long toes which are well adapted to soft uneven surfaces. They tend to have short, rounded wings and tend to be weak fliers.

- Virginia rail, Rallus limicola (U)

== Plovers and lapwings ==
Order: Charadriiformes Family: Charadriidae

The family Charadriidae includes the plovers, dotterels, and lapwings. They are small to medium-sized birds with compact bodies, short thick necks, and long, usually pointed, wings. They are found in open country worldwide, mostly in habitats near water.

- Killdeer, Charadrius vociferus (Unk)

== Sandpipers and allies ==
Order: Charadriiformes Family: Scolopacidae

Scolopacidae is a large diverse family of small to medium-sized shorebirds including the sandpipers, curlews, godwits, shanks, tattlers, woodcocks, snipes, dowitchers, and phalaropes. The majority of these species eat small invertebrates picked out of the mud or soil. Different lengths of legs and bills enable multiple species to feed in the same habitat, particularly on the coast, without direct competition for food.

- Baird's sandpiper, Calidris bairdii (R)
- Wilson's snipe, Gallinago delicata (Unk)
- Spotted sandpiper, Actitis macularia
- Solitary sandpiper, Tringa solitaria (R)
- Greater yellowlegs, Tringa melanoleuca (R)
- Wilson's phalarope, Phalaropus tricolor (NC)
- Red-necked phalarope, Phalaropus lobatus (Unk)

== Auks, murres, and puffins ==
Order: Charadriiformes Family: Alcidae

The family Alcidae includes auks, murres, and puffins. These are short winged birds that live on the open sea and normally only come ashore for breeding.

- Marbled murrelet, Brachyramphus marmoratus (U)

== Gulls, terns, and skimmers ==
Order: Charadriiformes Family: Laridae

Laridae is a family of medium to large seabirds and includes gulls, terns, kittiwakes, and skimmers. They are typically gray or white, often with black markings on the head or wings. They have stout, longish bills and webbed feet.

- Black-legged kittiwake, Rissa tridactyla (NC)
- Ring-billed gull, Larus delawarensis (NC)
- California gull, Larus californicus (Unk)
- Caspian tern, Hydroprogne caspia (Unk)

== Loons ==
Order: Gaviiformes Family: Gaviidae

Loons are aquatic birds the size of a large duck, to which they are unrelated. Their plumage is largely gray or black, and they have spear-shaped bills. Loons swim well and fly adequately, but are almost hopeless on land, because their legs are placed towards the rear of the body.

- Common loon, Gavia immer (R)

== Cormorants and shags ==
Order: Suliformes Family: Phalacrocoracidae

Cormorants are medium-to-large aquatic birds, usually with mainly dark plumage and areas of colored skin on the face. The bill is long, thin, and sharply hooked. Their feet are four-toed and webbed.

- Double-crested cormorant, Nannopterum auritum (NC)

== Herons, egrets, and bitterns ==
Order: Pelecaniformes Family: Ardeidae

The family Ardeidae contains the herons, egrets, and bitterns. Herons and egrets are medium to large wading birds with long necks and legs. Bitterns tend to be shorter necked and more secretive. Members of Ardeidae fly with their necks retracted, unlike other long-necked birds such as storks, ibises, and spoonbills.

- Great blue heron, Ardea herodias

== New World vultures ==
Order: Cathartiformes Family: Cathartidae

The New World vultures are not closely related to Old World vultures, but superficially resemble them because of convergent evolution. Like the Old World vultures, they are scavengers; however, unlike Old World vultures, which find carcasses by sight, New World vultures have a good sense of smell with which they locate carcasses.

- Turkey vulture, Cathartes aura (Unk)

== Osprey ==
Order: Accipitriformes Family: Pandionidae

Pandionidae is a monotypic family of fish-eating birds of prey. Its single species possesses a very large and powerful hooked beak, strong legs, strong talons, and keen eyesight.

- Osprey, Pandion haliaetus (U)

== Hawks, eagles, and kites ==
Order: Accipitriformes Family: Accipitridae

Accipitridae is a family of birds of prey, which includes hawks, eagles, kites, harriers, and Old World vultures. These birds have very large powerful hooked beaks for tearing flesh from their prey, strong legs, powerful talons, and keen eyesight.

- Bald eagle, Haliaeetus leucocephalus (Unk)
- Sharp-shinned hawk, Accipiter striatus (U)
- Cooper's hawk, Astur cooperii (Unk)
- American goshawk, Astur atricapillus (U)
- Northern harrier, Circus hudsonius (Unk)
- Swainson's hawk, Buteo swainsoni (R)
- Red-tailed hawk, Buteo jamaicensis (U)
- Rough-legged hawk, Buteo lagopus (Unk)
- Ferruginous hawk, Buteo regalis (NC)
- Golden eagle, Aquila chrysaetos (U)

== Barn-owls ==
Order: Strigiformes Family: Tytonidae

Barn-owls are medium to large owls with large heads and characteristic heart-shaped faces. They have long strong legs with powerful talons.

- Barn owl, Tyto alba (NC)

== Owls ==
Order: Strigiformes Family: Strigidae

Typical owls are small to large solitary nocturnal birds of prey. They have large forward-facing eyes and ears, a hawk-like beak, and a conspicuous circle of feathers around each eye called a facial disk.

- Western screech-owl, Megascops kennicottii (Unk)
- Great horned owl, Bubo virginianus
- Snowy owl, Bubo scandiacus (NC)
- Northern pygmy-owl, Glaucidium gnoma
- Spotted owl, Strix occidentalis (U)
- Barred owl, Strix varia
- Great gray owl, Strix nebulosa (NC)
- Long-eared owl, Asio otus (O)
- Boreal owl, Aegolius funereus (NC)
- Northern saw-whet owl, Aegolius acadicus (Unk)

== Kingfishers ==
Order: Coraciiformes Family: Alcedinidae

Kingfishers are medium-sized birds with large heads, long, pointed bills, short legs, and stubby tails.

- Belted kingfisher, Megaceryle alcyon

== Woodpeckers ==
Order: Piciformes Family: Picidae

Woodpeckers are small to medium-sized birds with chisel-like beaks, short legs, stiff tails, and long tongues used for capturing insects. Some species have feet with two toes pointing forward and two backward, while several species have only three toes. Many woodpeckers have the habit of tapping noisily on tree trunks with their beaks.

- Lewis's woodpecker, Melanerpes lewis (R)
- Williamson's sapsucker, Sphyrapicus thyroideus (NC)
- Red-breasted sapsucker, Sphyrapicus ruber (Unk)
- Downy woodpecker, Picoides pubescens
- Hairy woodpecker, Picoides villosus
- American three-toed woodpecker, Picoides dorsalis (U)
- Black-backed woodpecker, Picoides arcticus (R)
- Northern flicker, Colaptes auratus
- Pileated woodpecker, Dryocopus pileatus (U)

== Falcons and caracaras ==
Order: Falconiformes Family: Falconidae

Falconidae is a family of diurnal birds of prey, notably the falcons and caracaras. They differ from hawks, eagles, and kites in that they kill with their beaks instead of their talons.

- American kestrel, Falco sparverius (Unk)
- Merlin, Falco columbarius (R)
- Peregrine falcon, Falco peregrinus (U)
- Prairie falcon, Falco mexicanus (U)

== Tyrant flycatchers ==
Order: Passeriformes Family: Tyrannidae

Tyrant flycatchers are Passerine birds which occur throughout North and South America. They superficially resemble the Old World flycatchers, but are more robust and have stronger bills. They do not have the sophisticated vocal capabilities of the songbirds. Most, but not all, are rather plain. As the name implies, most are insectivorous.

- Olive-sided flycatcher, Contopus cooperi (U)
- Western wood-pewee, Contopus sordidulus (U)
- Willow flycatcher, Empidonax traillii (R)
- Hammond's flycatcher, Empidonax hammondii (R)
- Dusky flycatcher, Empidonax oberholseri (R)
- Western flycatcher, Empidonax difficilis (U)

== Vireos, shrike-babblers, and erpornis ==
Order: Passeriformes Family: Vireonidae

The vireos are a group of small to medium-sized passerine birds restricted to the New World, though a few other members of the family occur in Asia. They are typically greenish in color and resemble wood warblers apart from their heavier bills.

- Hutton's vireo, Vireo huttoni (U)
- Cassin's vireo, Vireo cassinii

== Shrikes ==
Order: Passeriformes Family: Laniidae

Shrikes are passerine birds known for their habit of catching other birds and small animals and impaling the uneaten portions of their bodies on thorns. A shrike's beak is hooked, like that of a typical bird of prey.

- Northern shrike, Lanius borealis (NC)

== Crows, jays, and magpies ==
Order: Passeriformes Family: Corvidae

The family Corvidae includes crows, ravens, jays, choughs, magpies, treepies, nutcrackers, and ground jays. Corvids are above average in size among the Passeriformes, and some of the larger species show high levels of intelligence.

- Canada jay, Perisoreus canadensis
- Steller's jay, Cyanocitta stelleri
- Clark's nutcracker, Nucifraga columbiana
- Black-billed magpie, Pica hudsonia (R)
- American crow, Corvus brachyrhynchos (U)
- Common raven, Corvus corax

== Tits, chickadees, and titmice ==
Order: Passeriformes Family: Paridae

The Paridae are mainly small stocky woodland species with short stout bills. Some have crests. They are adaptable birds, with a mixed diet including seeds and insects.

- Black-capped chickadee, Poecile atricapilla (U)
- Mountain chickadee, Poecile gambeli
- Chestnut-backed chickadee, Poecile rufescens

== Larks ==
Order: Passeriformes Family: Alaudidae

Larks are small terrestrial birds with often extravagant songs and display flights. Most larks are fairly dull in appearance. Their food is insects and seeds.

- Horned lark, Eremophila alpestris (U)

== Swallows ==
Order: Passeriformes Family: Hirundinidae

The family Hirundinidae is adapted to aerial feeding. They have a slender streamlined body, long pointed wings, and a short bill with a wide gape. The feet are adapted to perching rather than walking, and the front toes are partially joined at the base.

- Tree swallow, Tachycineta bicolor (R)
- Violet-green swallow, Tachycineta thalassina
- Northern rough-winged swallow, Stelgidopteryx serripennis (NC)
- Barn swallow, Hirundo rustica

== Long-tailed tits ==
Order: Passeriformes Family: Aegithalidae

Long-tailed tits are a group of small passerine birds with medium to long tails. They make woven bag nests in trees. Most eat a mixed diet which includes insects.

- Bushtit, Psaltriparus minimus (Unk)

== Kinglets ==
Order: Passeriformes Family: Regulidae

The kinglets are a small family of birds which resemble the titmice. They are very small insectivorous birds, mostly in the genus Regulus. The adults have colored crowns, giving rise to their names.

- Ruby-crowned kinglet, Corthylio calendula (U)
- Golden-crowned kinglet, Regulus satrapa

== Waxwings ==
Order: Passeriformes Family: Bombycillidae

The waxwings are a group of passerine birds with soft silky plumage and unique red tips to some of the wing feathers. In the Bohemian and cedar waxwings, these tips look like sealing wax and give the group its name. These are arboreal birds of northern forests. They live on insects in summer and berries in winter.

- Cedar waxwing, Bombycilla cedrorum

== Nuthatches ==
Order: Passeriformes Family: Sittidae

Nuthatches are small woodland birds. They have the unusual ability to climb down trees head first, unlike other birds which can only go upwards. Nuthatches have big heads, short tails, and powerful bills and feet.

- Red-breasted nuthatch, Sitta canadensis
- White-breasted nuthatch, Sitta carolinensis (Unk)
- Pygmy nuthatch, Sitta pygmaea (R)

== Treecreepers ==
Order: Passeriformes Family: Certhiidae

Treecreepers are small woodland birds, brown above and white below. They have thin pointed down-curved bills which they use to extricate insects from bark. They have stiff tail feathers, like woodpeckers, which they use to support themselves on vertical trees.

- Brown creeper, Certhia americana

== Wrens ==
Order: Passeriformes Family: Troglodytidae

Wrens are small and inconspicuous birds, except for their loud songs. They have short wings and thin down-turned bills. Several species often hold their tails upright. All are insectivorous.

- Canyon wren, Catherpes mexicanus (O)
- Bewick's wren, Thryomanes bewickii (Unk)
- Northern house wren, Troglodytes aedon (Unk)
- Pacific wren, Troglodytes pacificus

== Starlings ==
Order: Passeriformes Family: Sturnidae

Starlings are small to medium-sized passerine birds with strong feet. Their flight is strong and direct and they are very gregarious. Their preferred habitat is fairly open country, and they eat insects and fruit. Plumage is typically dark with a metallic sheen.

- European starling, Sturnus vulgaris (I) (Unk)

== Dippers ==
Order: Passeriformes Family: Cinclidae

Dippers are small, stout, birds that feed in cold, fast moving streams.

- American dipper, Cinclus mexicanus

== Thrushes and allies ==
Order: Passeriformes Family: Turdidae

The thrushes are a group of passerine birds that occur mainly but not exclusively in the Old World. They are plump, soft plumaged, small to medium-sized insectivores or sometimes omnivores, often feeding on the ground. Many have attractive songs.

- Western bluebird, Sialia mexicana (Unk)
- Mountain bluebird, Sialia currucoides
- Townsend's solitaire, Myadestes townsendi (U)
- Swainson's thrush, Catharus ustulatus
- Hermit thrush, Catharus guttatus
- American robin, Turdus migratorius
- Varied thrush, Ixoreus naevius

== Old World sparrows ==
Order: Passeriformes Family: Passeridae

Old World sparrows are small passerine birds. In general, sparrows tend to be small plump brownish or grayish birds with short tails and short powerful beaks. Sparrows are seed eaters, but they also consume small insects.

- House sparrow, Passer domesticus (I) (NC)

== Wagtails and pipits ==
Order: Passeriformes Family: Motacillidae

Motacillidae is a family of small passerine birds with medium to long tails. They include the wagtails, longclaws, and pipits. They are slender ground-feeding insectivores of open country.

- American pipit, Anthus rubescens

== Finches, euphonias, and allies ==
Order: Passeriformes Family: Fringillidae

Finches are seed-eating passerine birds that are small to moderately large and have a strong beak, usually conical and in some species very large. All have twelve tail feathers and nine primaries. These birds have a bouncing flight with alternating bouts of flapping and gliding on closed wings, and most sing well.

- Evening grosbeak, Coccothraustes vespertinus
- Pine grosbeak, Pinicola enucleator (U)
- Gray-crowned rosy-finch, Leucosticte tephrocotis
- Cassin's finch, Haemorhous cassinii (U)
- Redpoll, Acanthis flammea (NC)
- Red crossbill, Loxia curvirostra (U)
- White-winged crossbill, Loxia leucoptera (R)
- Pine siskin, Spinus pinus
- American goldfinch, Spinus tristis

== Longspurs and snow buntings ==
Order: Passeriformes Family: Calcariidae

The Calcariidae are a group of passerine birds that had been traditionally grouped with the New World sparrows, but differ in a number of respects and are usually found in open grassy areas.

- Snow bunting, Plectrophenax nivalis (R)

== New World sparrows ==
Order: Passeriformes Family: Passerellidae

Until 2017, these species were considered part of the family Emberizidae. Most of the species are known as sparrows, but these birds are not closely related to the Old World sparrows which are in the family Passeridae. Many of these have distinctive head patterns.

- Chipping sparrow, Spizella passerina (Unk)
- Fox sparrow, Passerella iliaca (U)
- Dark-eyed junco, Junco hyemalis
- White-crowned sparrow, Zonotrichia leucophrys (Unk)
- Golden-crowned sparrow, Zonotrichia atricapilla (Unk)
- Vesper sparrow, Pooecetes gramineus (O)
- Savannah sparrow, Passerculus sandwichensis
- Song sparrow, Melospiza melodia
- Lincoln's sparrow, Melospiza lincolnii (U)
- Spotted towhee, Pipilo maculatus

== Troupials and allies ==
Order: Passeriformes Family: Icteridae

The icterids are a group of small to medium-sized, often colorful passerine birds restricted to the New World and include the grackles, New World blackbirds, and New World orioles. Most species have black as a predominant plumage color, often enlivened by yellow, orange, or red.

- Western meadowlark, Sturnella neglecta (Unk)
- Red-winged blackbird, Agelaius phoeniceus
- Brown-headed cowbird, Molothrus ater (R)
- Brewer's blackbird, Euphagus cyanocephalus (U)

== New World warblers ==
Order: Passeriformes Family: Parulidae

The wood-warblers are a group of small often colorful passerine birds restricted to the New World. Most are arboreal, but some like the ovenbird and the two waterthrushes, are more terrestrial. Most members of this family are insectivores.

- Orange-crowned warbler, Leiothlypis celata (U)
- Nashville warbler, Leiothlypis ruficapilla (R)
- MacGillivray's warbler, Geothlypis tolmiei
- Common yellowthroat, Geothlypis trichas (U)
- Yellow warbler, Setophaga petechia
- Yellow-rumped warbler, Setophaga coronata
- Black-throated gray warbler, Setophaga nigrescens (U)
- Townsend's warbler, Setophaga townsendi
- Hermit warbler, Setophaga occidentalis
- Wilson's warbler, Cardellina pusilla

== Cardinals and allies ==
Order: Passeriformes Family: Cardinalidae

The cardinals are a family of robust seed-eating birds with strong bills. They are typically associated with open woodland. The sexes usually have distinct plumages.

- Western tanager, Piranga ludoviciana
- Black-headed grosbeak, Pheucticus melanocephalus

== See also ==
- List of birds of Washington (state)
- List of birds
- Lists of birds by region
- List of North American birds
