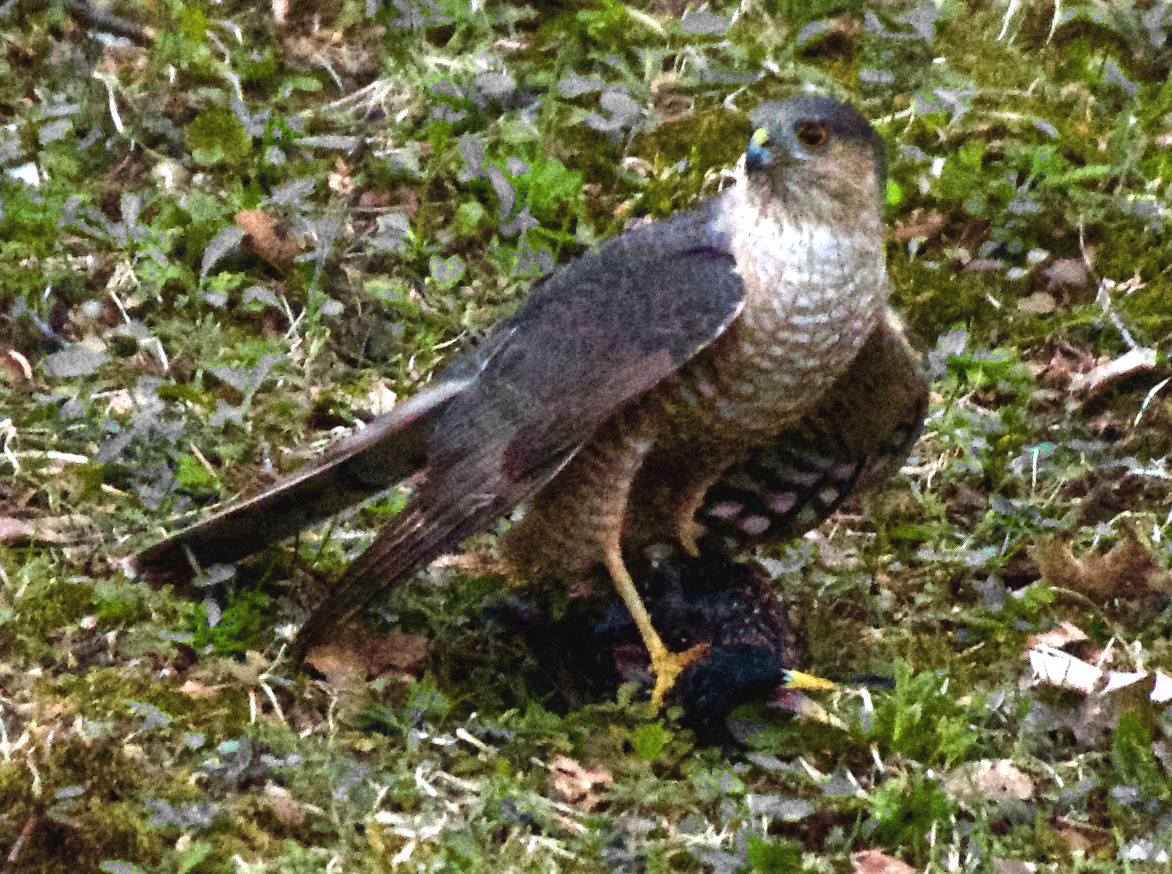
- Sharp-shinned hawk preyed by starling

Conservation status
- Least Concern (IUCN 3.1)

Scientific classification
- Kingdom: Animalia
- Phylum: Chordata
- Class: Aves
- Order: Accipitriformes
- Family: Accipitridae
- Genus: Accipiter
- Species: A. striatus

Binomial name
- Accipiter striatus Vieillot, 1808

Subspecies
- A. s. chionogaster A. s. erythronemius A. s. fringilloides A. s. madrensis A. s. perobscurus A. s. striatus A. s. suttoni A. s. velox A. s. venator A. s. ventralis
- Breeding Year-round Non-breeding

Synonyms
- Accipiter velox

= Sharp-shinned hawk =

Species of bird

The sharp-shinned hawk (Accipiter striatus) or northern sharp-shinned hawk, colloquially often nicknamed sharpie, is a small hawk, with males being the smallest hawks in the United States and Canada, but with the species averaging larger than some Neotropical species, such as the tiny hawk. The taxonomy is far from resolved, with some authorities considering the southern taxa to represent three separate species, white-breasted hawk (A. chionogaster), plain-breasted hawk (A. ventralis), and rufous-thighed hawk (A. erythronemius). The American Ornithological Society and some other checklists keep all four species conspecific. A recent genetic study additionally recommended splitting the three Caribbean island populations as three additional separate species, though this has not yet been adopted by any of the ornithological authorities.

== Taxonomy ==
The sharp-shinned hawk is sometimes separated into four species, with the northern group (see distribution) retaining both the scientific name and the common name sharp-shinned hawk (A. striatus). In addition to the nominate taxon A. s. striatus on Hispaniola, it includes the subspecies A. s. perobscurus on Haida Gwaii, A. s. velox in most of mainland North America, A. s. suttoni in northern Mexico and southern New Mexico, A. s. madrensis in southwest Mexico, A. s. fringilloides on Cuba, and A. s. venator on Puerto Rico. The three remaining taxa, each considered a monotypic species if split, are the white-breasted hawk (A. chionogaster Kaup, 1852 in southeast Mexico and Central America), plain-breasted hawk (A. ventralis Sclater, 1866 in the Andes) and rufous-thighed hawk (A. erythronemius Kaup, 1850 in southeastern South America). The breeding ranges of the groups are entirely allopatric, although the wintering range of the nominate group partially overlaps with the range of A. chionogaster (as is also the case with certain taxa within the nominate group). This allopatry combined with differences in plumage (see Appearance) and, apparently, certain measurements, has been the background for the split, but hard scientific data are presently lacking (AOU). Most material published in recent years (e.g. AOU, Ferguson-Lees et al. p. 586, and Dickinson et al.) has therefore considered all to be members of a single widespread species – but not without equivocation: Ferguson-Lees et al. say that if they were to make a world list, they would include the three taxa as separate species (p. 75), and the AOU's comment includes the note "split almost certainly good".

Storer (1952) suggested that the southernmost populations within the nominate group were paler below, thus approaching A. chionogaster. This has also been reflected in recent guides, where A. s. madrensis of southern Mexico is described as being relatively pale below (compared to more northern subspecies), but if this is a sign of intergradation with A. chionogaster or a north–south cline which includes both the members of the nominate group and A. chionogaster remains unclear. In Bolivia, A. ventralis and A. erythronemius approach each other, but no evidence of intergradation is known, something that, without actual specimens, would also be hard to prove due to the variability in the plumage of A. ventralis.

A 2021 study of sharp-shinned hawks recommended recognising the three endemic Caribbean island subspecies as distinct species, based on analysis of their nuclear and mitochondrial DNA showing no modern contact between them, and diagnosed by their plumage; A. striatus, restricted to the island of Hispaniola, A. fringilloides to Cuba and A. venator to Puerto Rico. If this is accepted and A. striatus treated as endemic to Hispaniola, the continental complex then takes the scientific name A. velox.

== Description ==
This is a small Accipiter hawk, with males 23 to 30 cm (9.1 to 11.8 in) long, with a wingspan of 42 to 58 cm (17 to 23 in) and weight from 82–115 g (2.9–4.1 oz). As common in Accipiter hawks, females are distinctly larger in size, averaging some 30% longer, and with a weight advantage of more than 50% being common. The female measures 29 to 37 cm (11 to 15 in) in length, has a wingspan of 58 to 68 cm (23 to 27 in) and weighs 150 to 219 g (5.3 to 7.7 oz). The wings measure 14.1–22.9 cm (5.6–9.0 in) each, the tail is 12–19 cm (4.7–7.5 in) long and the tarsus is 4.5–5.9 cm (1.8–2.3 in). Measurements given here are for the northern group, but they are comparable for the remaining subspecies. Adults have short broad wings and a medium-length tail banded in blackish and gray with the tip varying among individuals from slightly notched through square to slightly rounded (often narrowly tipped white). The remiges (typically only visible in flight) are whitish barred blackish. The legs are long and very slender (hence the common name) and yellow. The hooked bill is black and the cere is yellowish. The remaining plumage varies depending on group:

- Nominate group: Cap dark and upperparts blue-grey (the former darker). Often, a few more-or-less random white spots can be seen on the scapulars (feathers attached to the wing that cover the meeting of wing and body). Underparts white with rufous or tawny bars. The crissum (the undertail coverts surrounding the cloaca) is white. Thighs rufous, but often barred white. The cheeks are tinged rufous (sometimes faint, but generally very distinct in taxa from the Greater Antilles). The irides are dark orange to red, but these are yellowish to pale orange in juveniles. Juveniles have dark brownish upperparts, each feather edged rufous, giving a rather scaly appearance. The brown head is streaked whitish, and the whitish underparts are extensively streaked brown or reddish and usually with reddish barring on the sides.

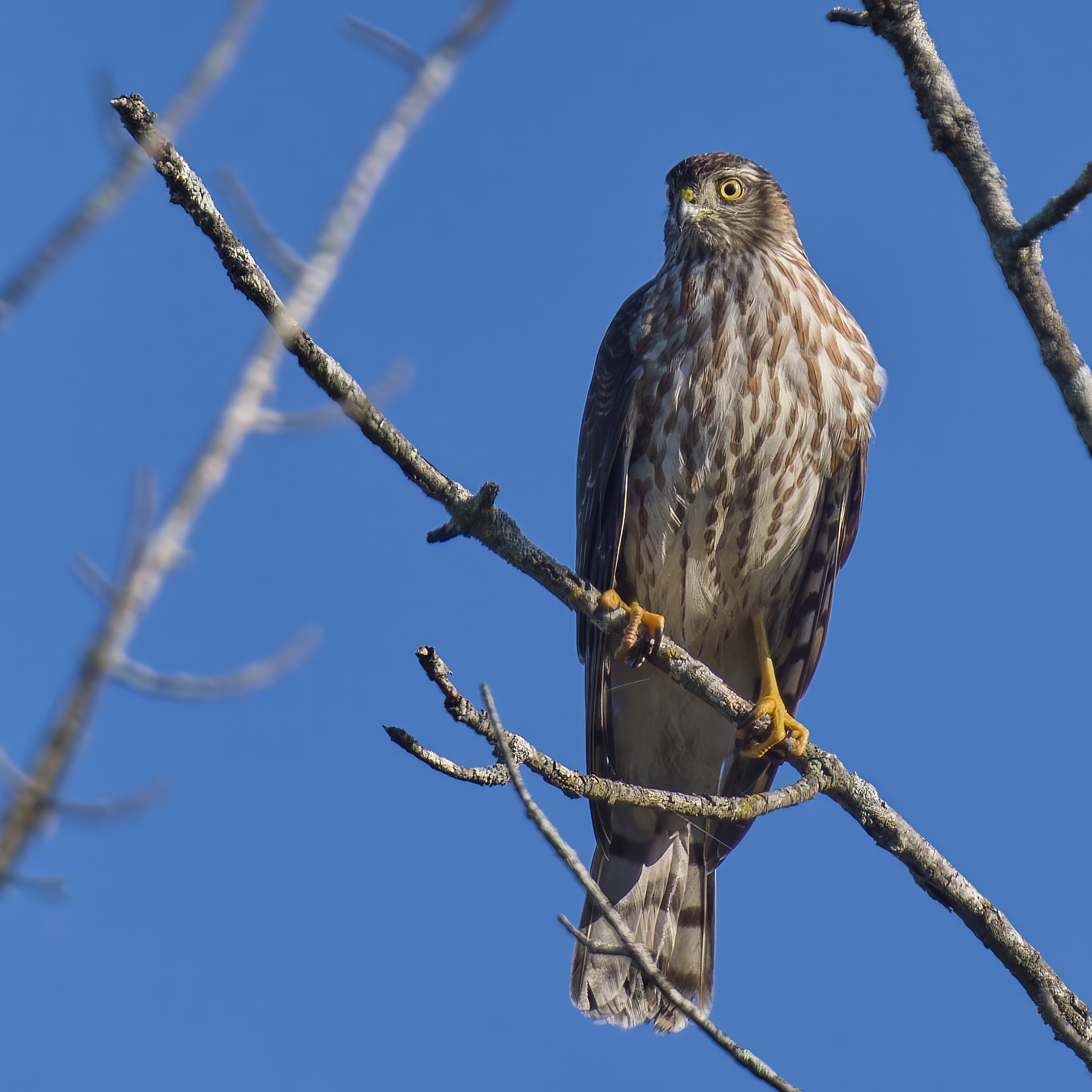
Typical rusty underside streaking of an immature individual.

- A. (s.) chionogaster (white-breasted hawk): Resembles the members of the nominate group, but upperparts darker (often appears almost black), thighs whitish-buff and underparts and cheeks entirely white. Juveniles have darker upperparts and distinctly finer streaking below than juveniles of the nominate group.
- A. (s.) ventralis (plain-breasted hawk): Polymorphic. The most common morph has dark grey upperparts (often appears almost black) and white underparts variably barred, shaded, or mottled with rufous or tawny-buff (extensively marked individuals may appear almost entirely rufous or tawny-buff below). Occasionally, the barring to the lower belly and flanks may appear duskier. The white morph has bluish-grey upperparts (similar to the nominate group), but its underparts are all white except for its rufous thighs. The rare dark morph, the only morph which sometimes lacks rufous thighs, is entirely sooty (occasionally with slight white barring to belly and faint grey bands in tail). The underparts of the females average paler than males of the same morph. The iris is typically yellow (contra illustrations in some books), but individuals (mainly sub-adults?) with a darker iris are occasionally seen. Juveniles have dark brownish or dusky upperparts with each feather typically edged rufous, giving a rather scaly appearance. The underparts are white streaked brown, and the thighs are rufous barred white. Occasionally, juveniles with underparts extensively rufous streaked blackish are seen.
- A. (s.) erythronemius (rufous-thighed hawk): Resembles the nominate group, but upperparts darker, streaking to underparts rufous or dusky, cheeks typically with a clear rufous patch (occasionally lacking almost entirely) and iris yellow (contra illustrations in some books). Juveniles resemble juveniles of the nominate group, but streaking to underparts typically restricted to throat and central underparts, with flanks scaled or barred (often also belly).

== Distribution ==
This species is widespread in North America, Central America, South America and the Greater Antilles. Below, the distributions of the four groups (see Taxonomy) are described as they occur roughly from north to south:

- The nominate (A. s. striatus) group is widespread in North America, occurring in all of the forested part of USA and Canada, breeding in most of it. Populations in the northern part of the range migrate south and spend the non-breeding season (winter) in the southern USA, Mexico and Central America as far south as Panama, with a smaller number spending the winter in the Greater Antilles. Resident populations exist in temperate parts of the US, Canada (in a few coastal regions), Mexico (highlands from Sonora to Oaxaca), Cuba, Hispaniola and Puerto Rico.
- A. (s.) chionogaster (white-breasted hawk) occurs in highlands from far southern Mexico (Chiapas and Oaxaca), through Honduras, Guatemala and El Salvador, to Nicaragua. It is, as far as known, resident, but some local movements may occur.
- A. (s.) ventralis (plain-breasted hawk) occurs in the coastal mountains of northern Venezuela and Colombia, south through the Andes from western Venezuela, through Colombia, Ecuador and Peru, to central Bolivia. A disjunct population occurs in the Tepuis of southern Venezuela (likely to extend into adjacent parts of Roraima in far northern Brazil, but this remains unconfirmed). It is, as far as known, resident, but some local movements may occur.
- A. (s.) erythronemius (rufous-thighed hawk) is widespread in eastern South America in eastern and southern Brazil, Uruguay, Paraguay, north-eastern Argentina and south-eastern Bolivia. It is, as far as known, resident in some regions and migratory in others. The movements are generally poorly understood, but it only occurs seasonally at some localities in Argentina.

== Habitat ==
It occurs in a wide range of woodland and forest types, both dominated by conifers and by various types of broad-leaved trees (especially oaks) The largest populations of the nominate group (see taxonomy) are thought to occur in the temperate boreal forests, but winter in warmer regions farther south (see distribution). The taxa A. s. suttoni, A. s. madrensis (both from the nominate group), A. chionogaster (white-breasted hawk) and A. ventralis (plain-breasted hawk), are found in upper tropical to temperate highlands; mainly at altitudes of 300–3,000 m (980–9,840 ft), but occasionally down to near sea-level and up to 4,000 m (13,000 ft). The taxon A. erythronemius (rufous-thighed hawk) is found in tropical and subtropical regions; both in lowlands and highlands.

== Behaviour ==
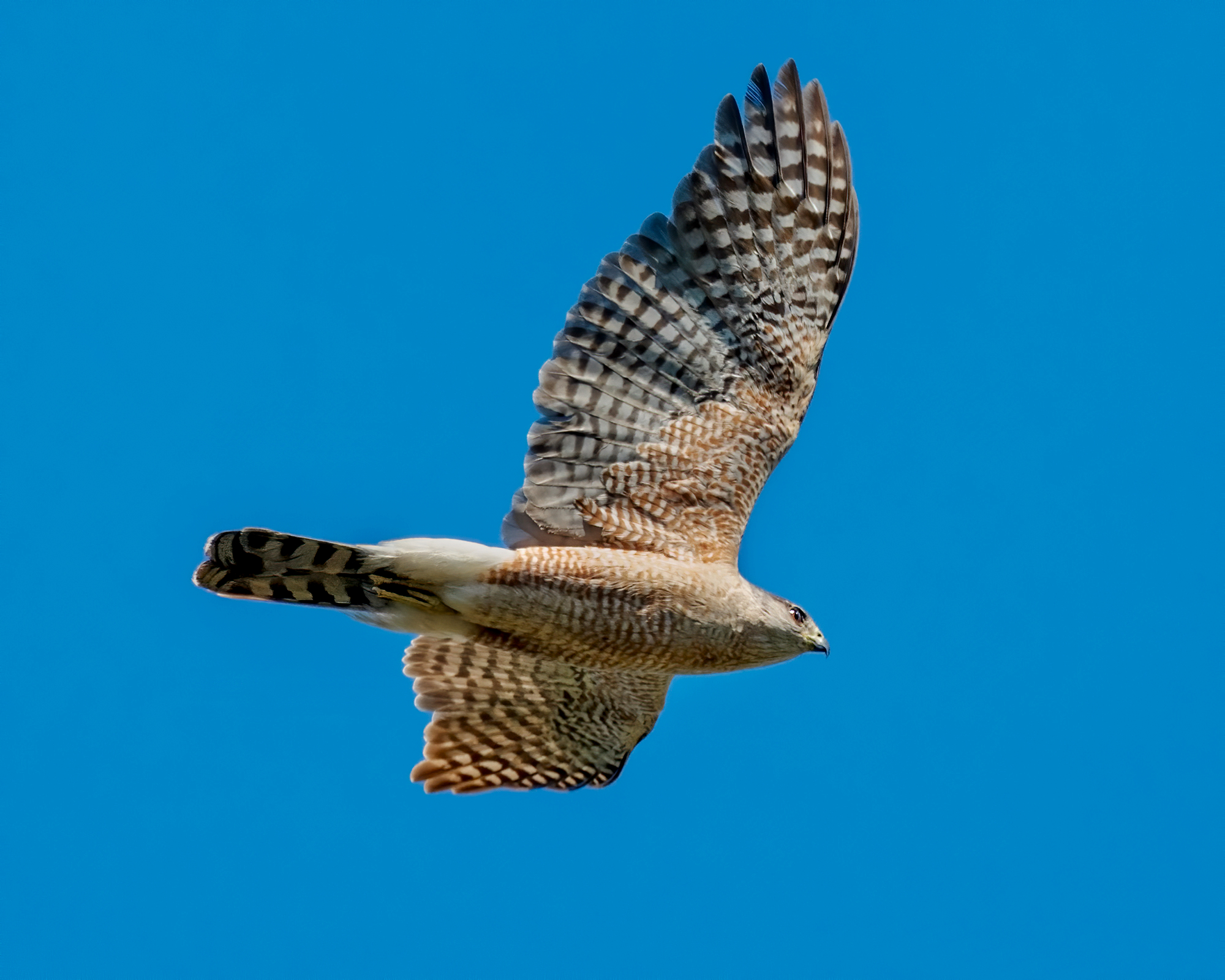
Adult in flight, Goleta, California

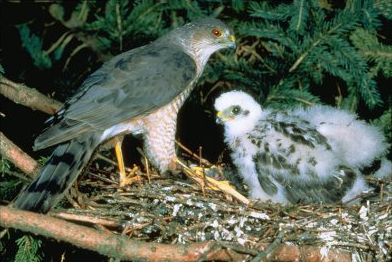
With a chick (nominate group)

=== Diet ===
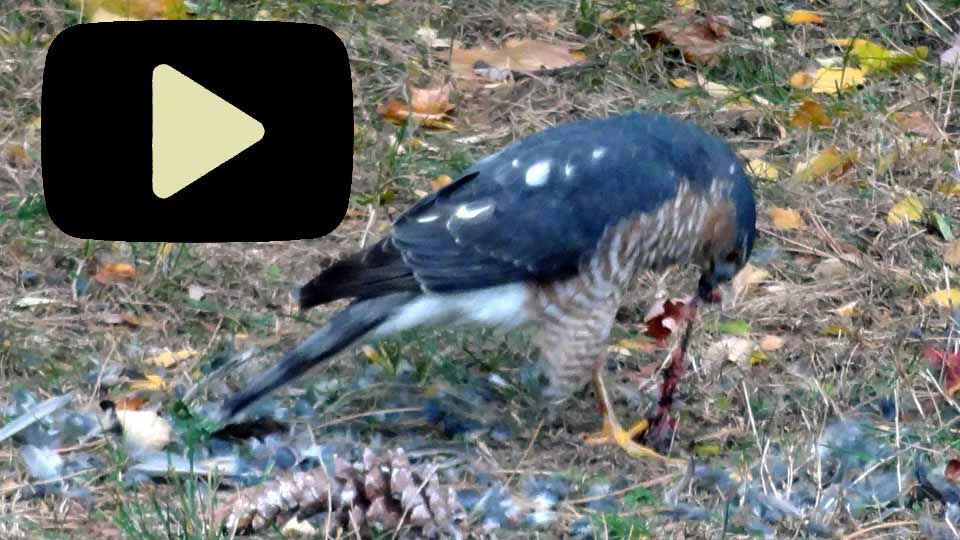
Click for video of feeding sharp-shinned hawk

These birds surprise and capture most of their prey from cover or while flying quickly through dense vegetation. They are adept at navigating dense thickets, although this hunting method is often hazardous to the hawk. The great majority of this hawk's prey are small birds, especially various songbirds such as sparrows, wood-warblers, finches, wrens, nuthatches, tits, icterids and even thrushes. Birds caught range in size from a 4.4 g (0.16 oz) Anna's hummingbird to a 577 g (1.272 lb) ruffed grouse and virtually any bird within this size range is potential prey. Typically, males will target smaller birds, such as sparrows and wood-warblers, and females will pursue larger prey, such as American robins and flickers, leading to a lack of conflict between the sexes for prey. These hawks often exploit backyard bird feeders in order to target congregations of ideal prey. They often pluck the feathers off their prey on a post or other perch. Rarely, sharp-shinned hawks will also eat rodents, lizards, frogs, snakes, and large insects, the latter typically being dragonflies captured on the wing during the hawk's migration. Bats have occasionally been recorded as a prey of this hawk.

=== Reproduction ===
Sharp-shinned hawks construct a stick nest in a large conifer or dense group of deciduous trees. Clutches of 3 to 8 eggs have been recorded, but 4 to 5 eggs is the typical clutch size. The eggs measure 37.6 mm × 30 mm (1.48 in × 1.18 in) and weigh about 19 g (0.67 oz). The eggs are heavily marked with colourful and varied markings. The incubation period is thought to average at about 30 days. After hatching, the young are brooded for 16 to 23 days by the female, while the male defends the territory and catches prey. The young fledge at the age of about a month and rely on their parents for feeding and protection another four weeks. The nesting sites and breeding behaviour of sharp-shinned hawks are generally secretive, in order to avoid the predation of larger raptors, such as the American goshawk and the Cooper's hawk. While in migration, adults are sometimes preyed on by most of the bird-hunting, larger raptors, especially the peregrine falcon. The breeding behaviour of the taxa chionogaster (white-breasted hawk), ventralis (plain-breasted hawk) and erythronemius (rufous-thighed hawk) are comparably poorly known, but based on the available knowledge they appear to differ little from that of the nominate group

In Puerto Rico, sharp-shinned hawks may be eaten by some growth stages of invasive boa constrictors.

== Conservation ==
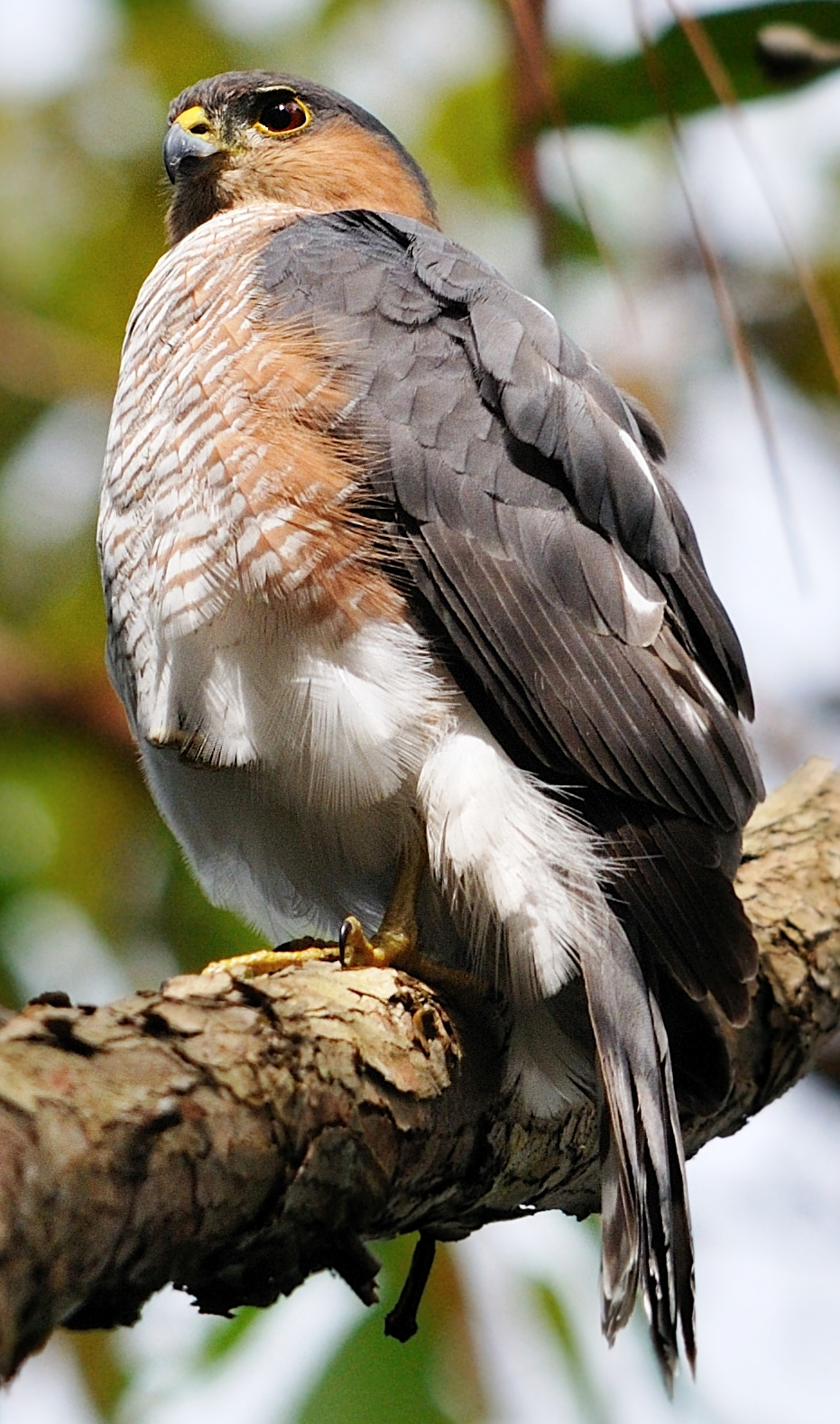
Endangered subspecies venator, endemic to Puerto Rico

In North America this species declined in numbers in the 1960s and 1970s, probably as a result of the use of DDT and other pesticides. The population of USA and Canada has rebounded since and might even exceed historical numbers today, probably due to the combination of the ban on DDT and the proliferation of backyard bird feeders in North America which create unnaturally reliable and easy prey sources. Migratory sharp-shinned hawks are one of the most numerous raptors recorded at "hawk watches" across the country. An exception is the subspecies from Puerto Rico, Accipiter striatus venator, which is rare and listed as endangered by the U.S. Fish & Wildlife Service. The remaining resident subspecies from the Greater Antilles, fringilliodes from Cuba and nominate (A. s. striatus) from Hispaniola, are uncommon, local, and, at least in the case of the latter, decreasing. Both ventralis (plain-breasted hawk) and erythronemius (rufous-thighed hawk) are fairly common (but easily overlooked due to their secretive behaviour) and presently considered safe. The situation for chionogaster (white-breasted hawk) is potentially more problematic due to its limited range, although it, at least locally, remains fairly common.
