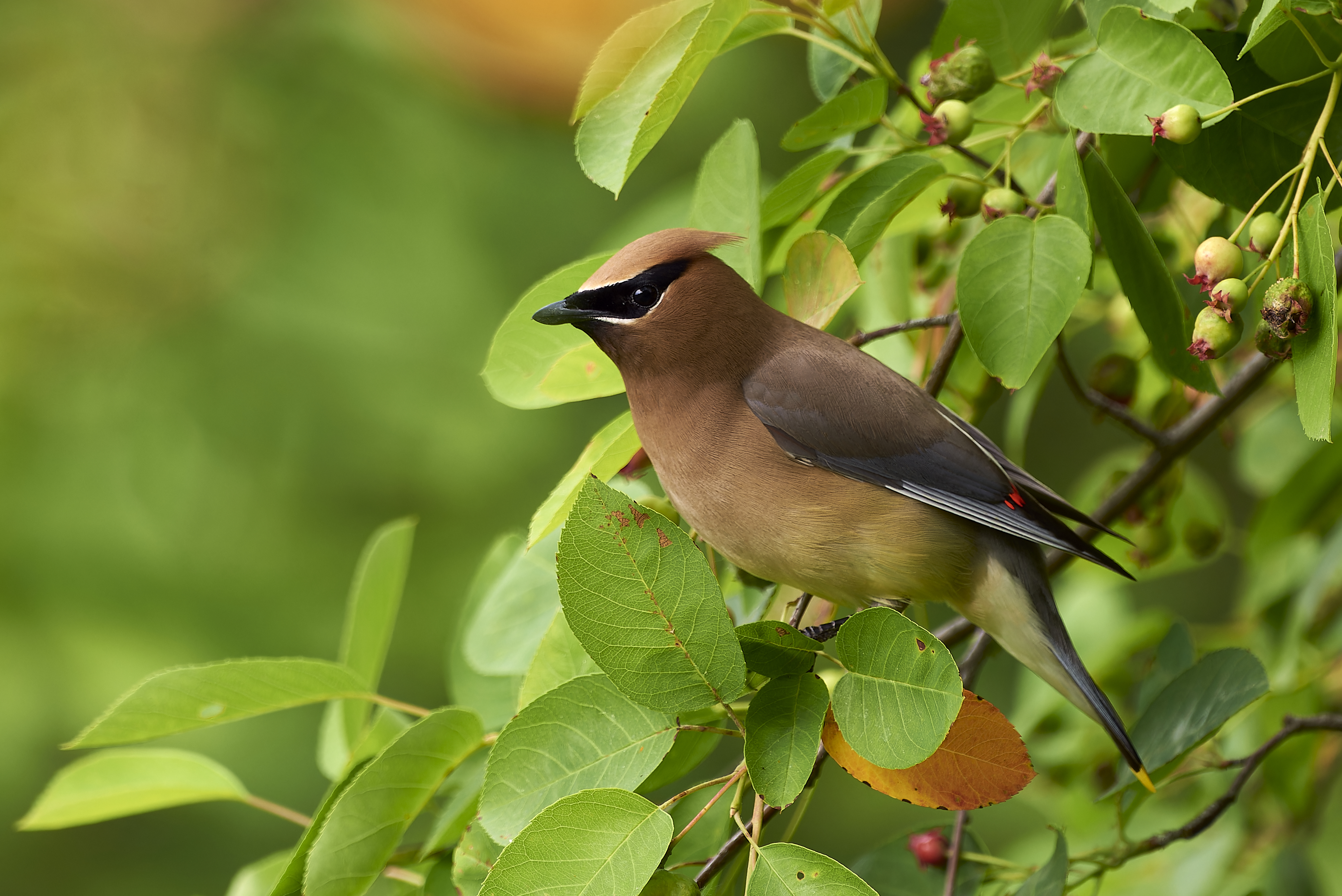
- Cedar waxwing (Bombycilla cedrorum)

Scientific classification
- Kingdom: Animalia
- Phylum: Chordata
- Class: Aves
- Order: Passeriformes
- Infraorder: Passerides
- Parvorder: Muscicapida
- Superfamily: Bombycilloidea
- Family: Bombycillidae; William Swainson, 1831
- Genus: Bombycilla; Vieillot, 1808

Type species
- Bombycilla cedrorum

Species
- B. garrulus; B. japonica; B. cedrorum

= Waxwing =

Waxwings

Genus of birds

The waxwings are three species of passerine birds classified in the genus Bombycilla. They are pinkish-brown and pale grey with distinctive smooth plumage in which many body feathers are not individually visible, a black and white eyestripe, a crest, a square-cut tail and pointed wings. Some of the wing feathers have red tips, the resemblance of which to sealing wax gives these birds their common name. According to most authorities, this is the only genus placed in the family Bombycillidae, although sometimes the family is extended to include related taxa that are more usually included in separate families: silky flycatchers (Ptiliogonatidae (e.g. Phainoptila)), Hypocolius (Hypocoliidae), Hylocitrea (Hylocitreidae), palmchats (Dulidae) and the Hawaiian honeyeaters (Mohoidae). There are three species: the Bohemian waxwing (B. garrulus), the Japanese waxwing (B. japonica) and the cedar waxwing (B. cedrorum).

Waxwings are not long-distance migrants, but move nomadically outside the breeding season. Waxwings mostly feed on insects in summer and fruit in winter; at times of year when fruit and insects are unavailable, they may also feed on sap, buds, and flowers. They catch insects by gleaning through foliage or in mid-air. They often nest near water, the female building a loose nest at the fork of a branch, well away from the trunk of the tree. She also incubates the eggs, the male bringing her food to the nest, and both sexes help rear the young. Waxwings appear in art and have been mentioned in literature.

== Taxonomy ==
The waxwings are the sole genus in the family Bombycillidae. In the past, some other related birds were also included in the family, including the silky-flycatchers (now Ptiliogonatidae), the grey hypocolius (now Hypocoliidae), the palm chat (now Dulidae), and the hylocitrea (now Hylocitreidae); these are all now treated, along with the Mohoidae, in the superfamily Bombycilloidea.

=== Species ===
Genus Bombycilla – Vieillot, 1808 – three species
Common name	Scientific name and subspecies	Range	Size and ecology	IUCN status and estimated population
Bohemian waxwing	Bombycilla garrulus (Linnaeus, 1758) Three subspecies: B. g. garrulus (Linnaeus, 1758) (Old World); B. g. centralasiae (Polyakov, 1915): breeds from the Urals eastwards across northern Asia; B. g. pallidiceps (Reichenow, 1908) (New World)	northern regions of Eurasia and North America.	Size: Habitat: Diet:	LC
Japanese waxwing	Bombycilla japonica (Siebold, 1824)	Breeding in the Russian Far East and Heilongjiang Province, north-east China, Wintering in Japan, Korea, and eastern China	Size: Habitat: Diet:	NT
Cedar waxwing	Bombycilla cedrorum Vieillot, 1808	United States, Mexico	Size: Habitat: Diet:	LC

=== Etymology ===
Bombycilla, the genus name, is Vieillot's attempt at Latin for "silktail", translating the German name Seidenschwänze. Vieillot thought that motacilla, Latin for wagtails, was derived from mota for "move" and cilla, which he thought meant "tail"; however, Motacilla actually combines motacis, a mover, with the diminutive suffix -illa. He then combined this "cilla" with the Latin bombyx, meaning silk.

== Description ==
Waxwings are characterised by soft silky plumage. They have unique red tips to the secondary feathers of the wing (most obvious in adult Bohemian waxwing and cedar waxwing, often absent in Japanese waxwing, and sometimes absent in immatures of the other two), where the shafts extend beyond the barbs; these tips look like sealing wax, and give the group its common name. The legs are short and strong, and the wings are pointed. The male and female have the same plumage. All three species have mainly pale grey-brown plumage, a black line through the eye, and black under the chin, a square-ended tail with a red or yellow tip, and a pointed crest. The bill, eyes, and feet are blackish. The adults moult between August and November, but may suspend their moult and continue after migration. Calls are high-pitched, buzzing or trilling monosyllables.

== Behaviour ==
=== Diet ===
These are arboreal birds that breed in northern taiga forests. Their main foods are insects, which they eat in spring and summer (and if available, at other times of the year) and fruit, which they eat from early summer (strawberries, mulberries, and serviceberries) through late summer and autumn (raspberries, blackberries, cherries, and honeysuckle berries) into late autumn and winter (rowan, cotoneaster, viburnum fruit, crabapples, rose hips, dogwood berries, juniper cones, grapes, and mistletoe berries); the juicy berries of rowans are the most important. They pluck fruit from a perch or occasionally while hovering. In spring they replace fruit with sap, buds, and flowers. In warmer periods of the year they catch many insects by gleaning or by flycatching in midair, and often nest near water where flying insects are abundant.

Waxwings are known to eat fermented berries and become drunken.They have a rather large liver which can handle copious amounts of ethanol, which would otherwise be lethal for birds of the same size. Drunken waxwings often fly into windows or buildings, with fatal results.

=== Reproduction ===
Waxwings also choose nest sites in places with rich supplies of fruit and breed late in the year to take advantage of summer ripening. However, they may start courting as early as the winter. Pairing includes a ritual in which mates pass a fruit or small inedible object back and forth several times until one eats it (if it is a fruit). After this they may copulate. Many pairs may nest close together in places with good food supplies, and pairs do not defend a territory (perhaps the reason waxwings have no true song), but a bird may attack intruders, perhaps to guard its mate. Both birds gather nest materials, but the female does most of the construction, usually on a horizontal limb or in a crotch well away from the tree trunk, at any height. She makes a loose, bulky nest of twigs, grass, and lichen, which she lines with fine grass, moss, and pine needles and may camouflage with dangling pieces of grass, flowers, lichen, and moss. The female incubates, fed by the male on the nest, but once the eggs hatch, both birds feed the young.

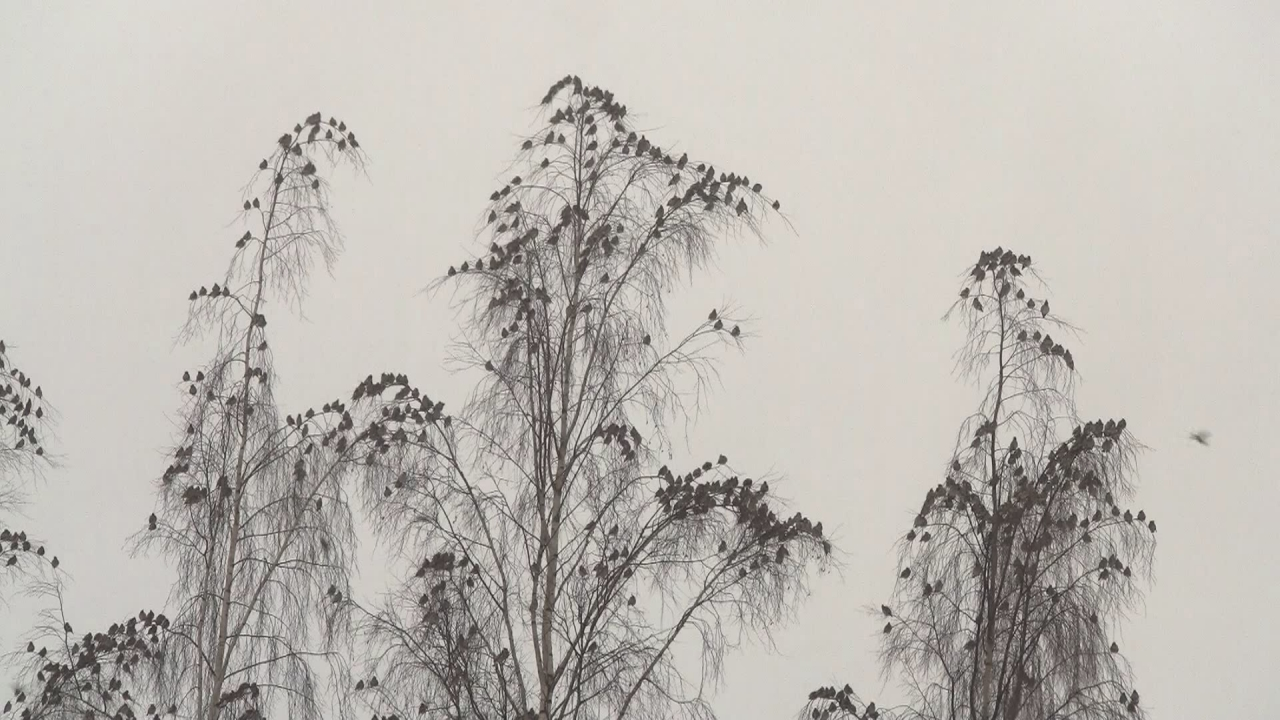
Bohemian waxwings often form large flocks of several hundred during winter, searching for food

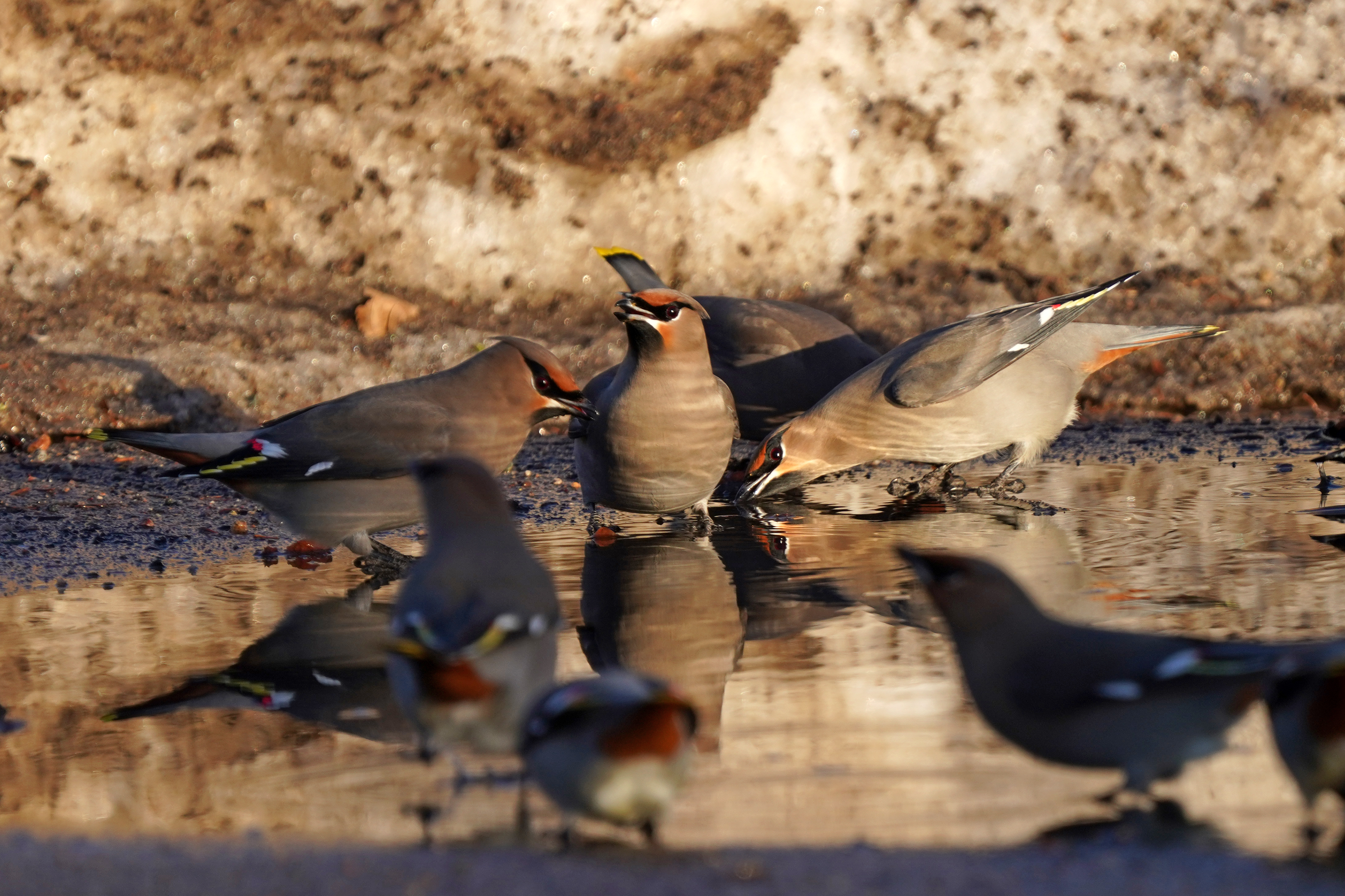
Bohemian waxwings drinking. Many berries are dry, and access to drinking water (or snow to eat) is important

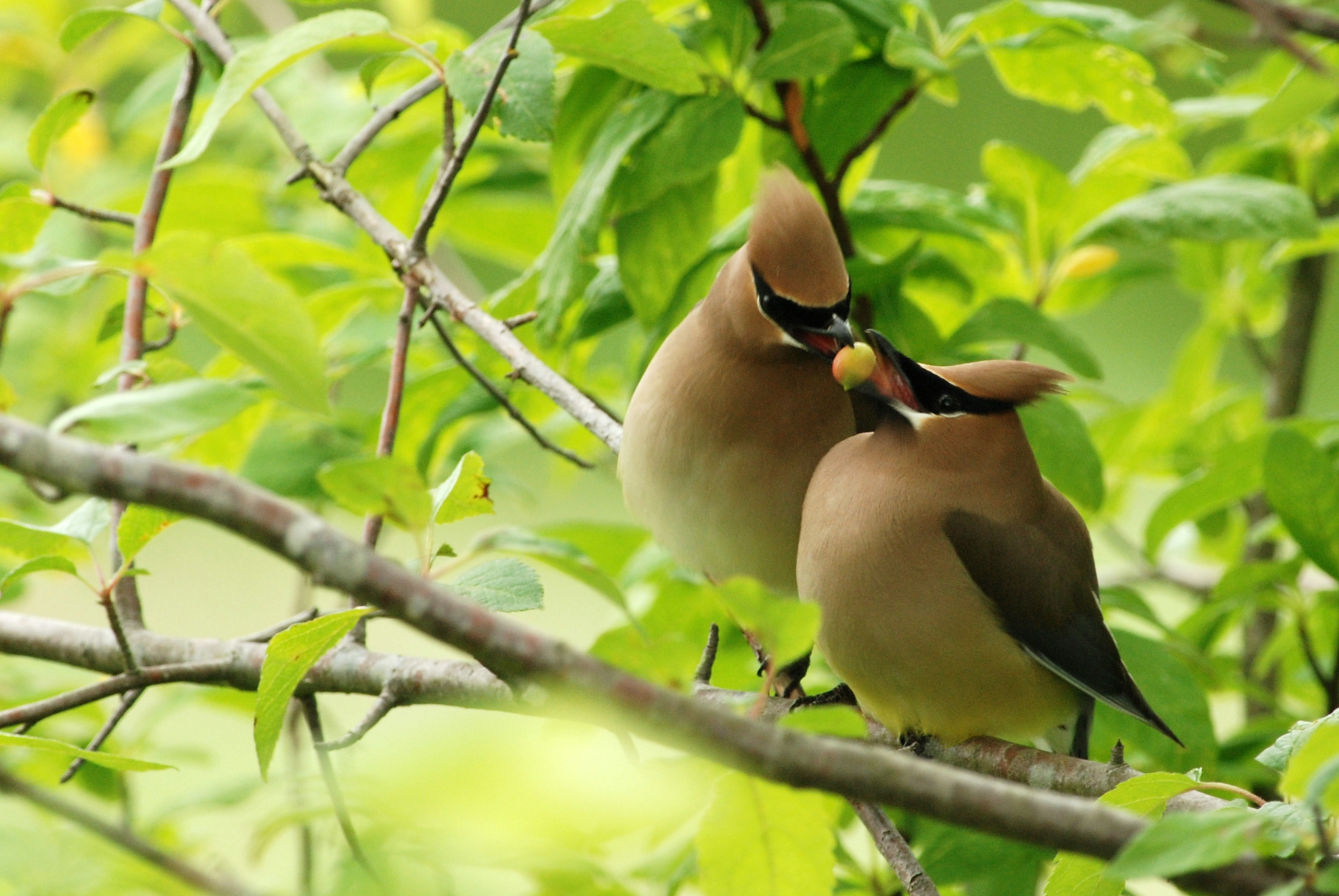
Cedar waxwing pair passing a berry back and forth during courtship

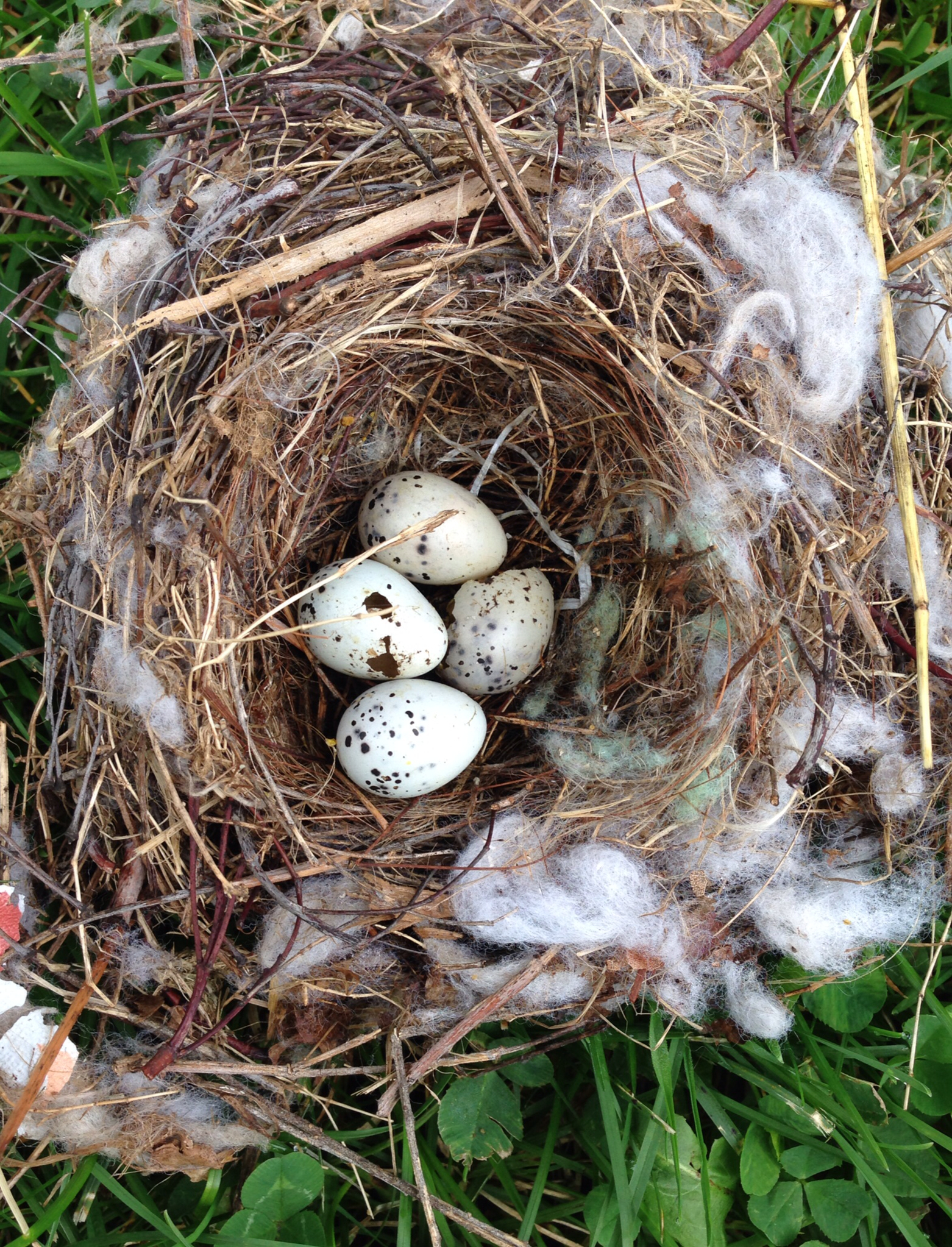
Cedar waxwing nest and eggs

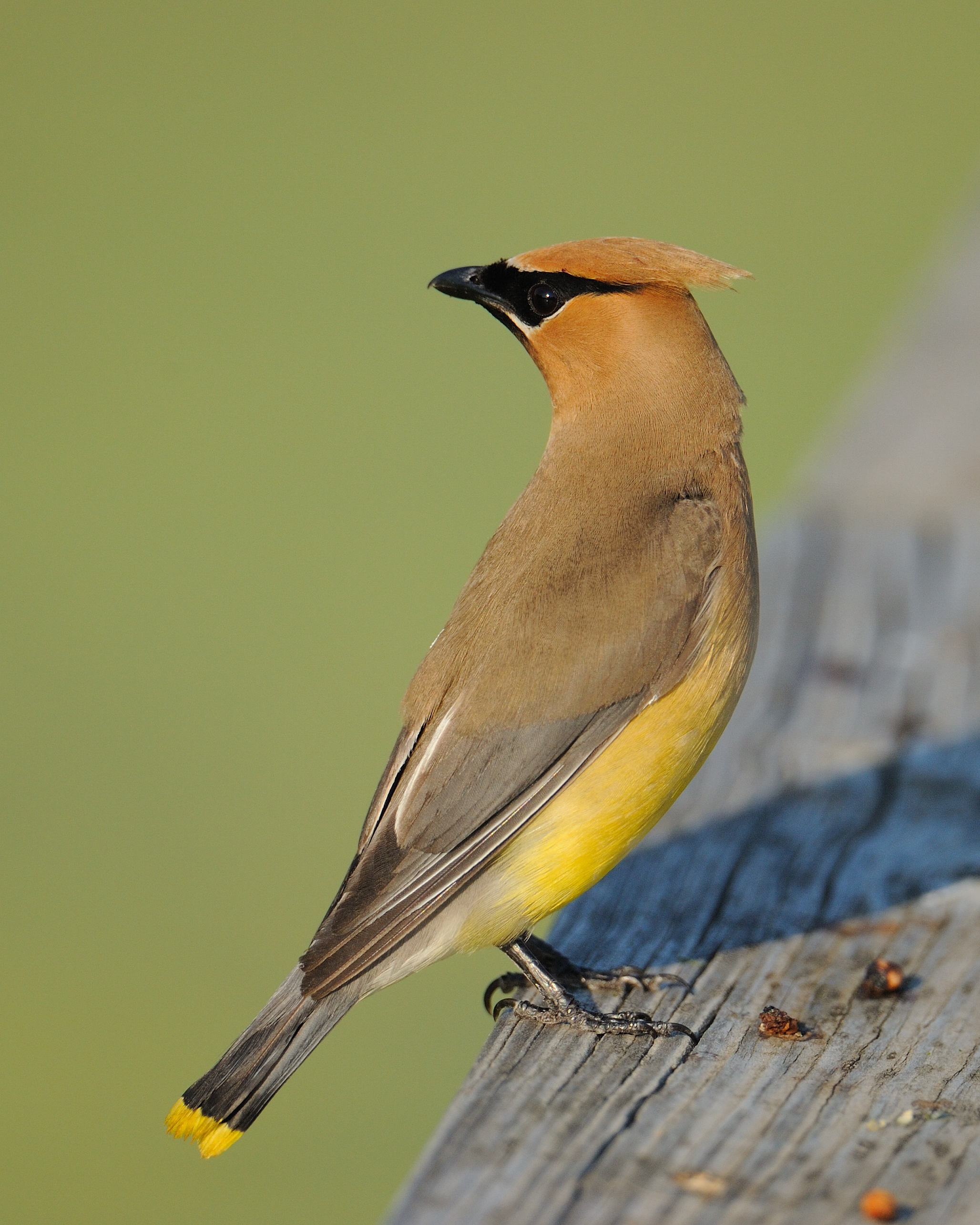
The red tips on the secondaries are often absent on immature birds, such as this cedar waxwing

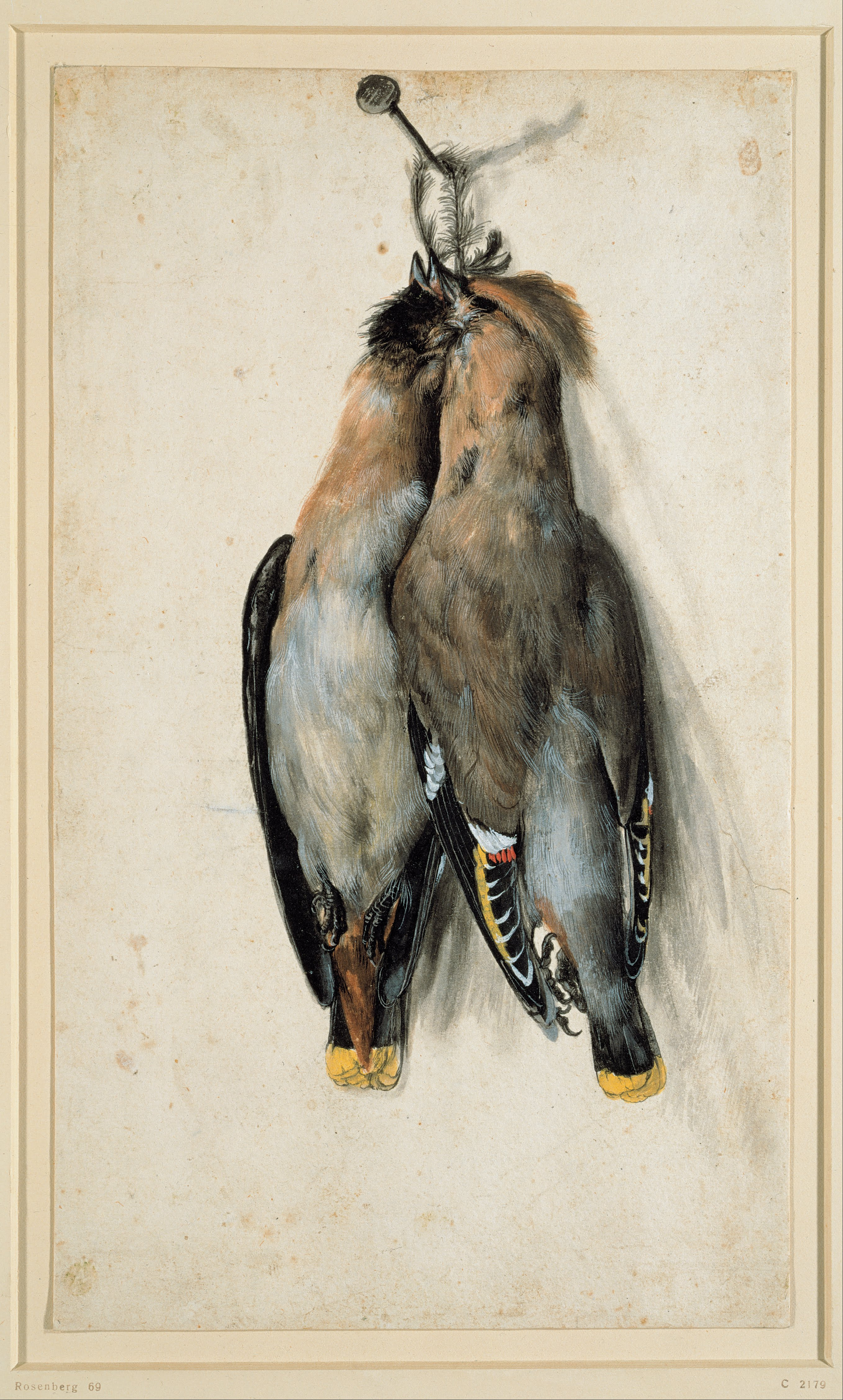
Two Dead Bohemian Waxwings by Lucas Cranach the elder, ca. 1530

=== Migration ===
They are not true long-distance migrants, but wander erratically outside the breeding season and move south from their summer range in winter. In years with poor berry crops, huge numbers can irrupt well beyond their normal winter range, often in large flocks of hundreds or occasionally even thousands.
