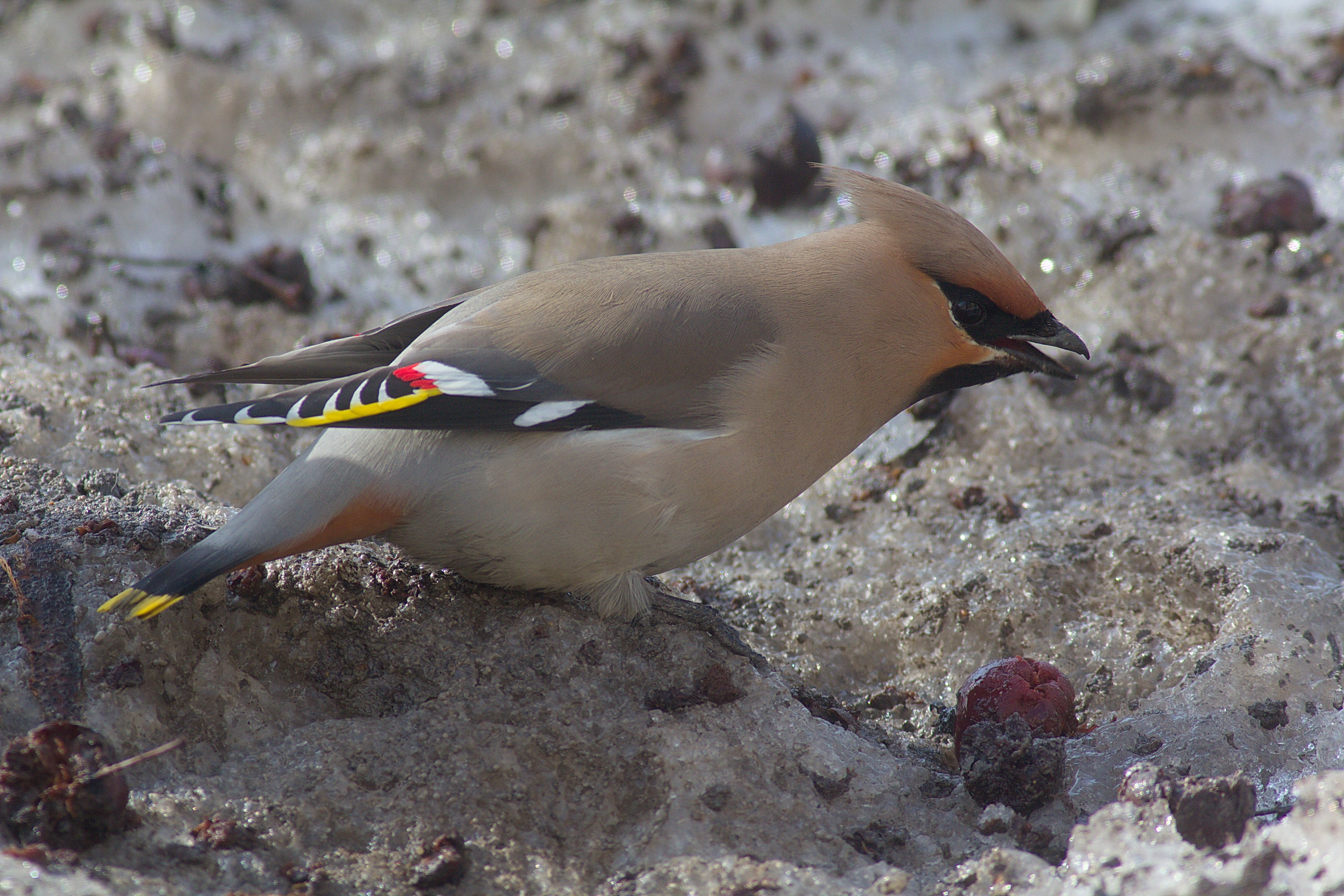
- Adult B. g. garrulus, Novosibirsk, Russia

Conservation status
- Least Concern (IUCN 3.1)

Scientific classification
- Kingdom: Animalia
- Phylum: Chordata
- Class: Aves
- Order: Passeriformes
- Family: Bombycillidae
- Genus: Bombycilla
- Species: B. garrulus

Binomial name
- Bombycilla garrulus (Linnaeus, 1758)
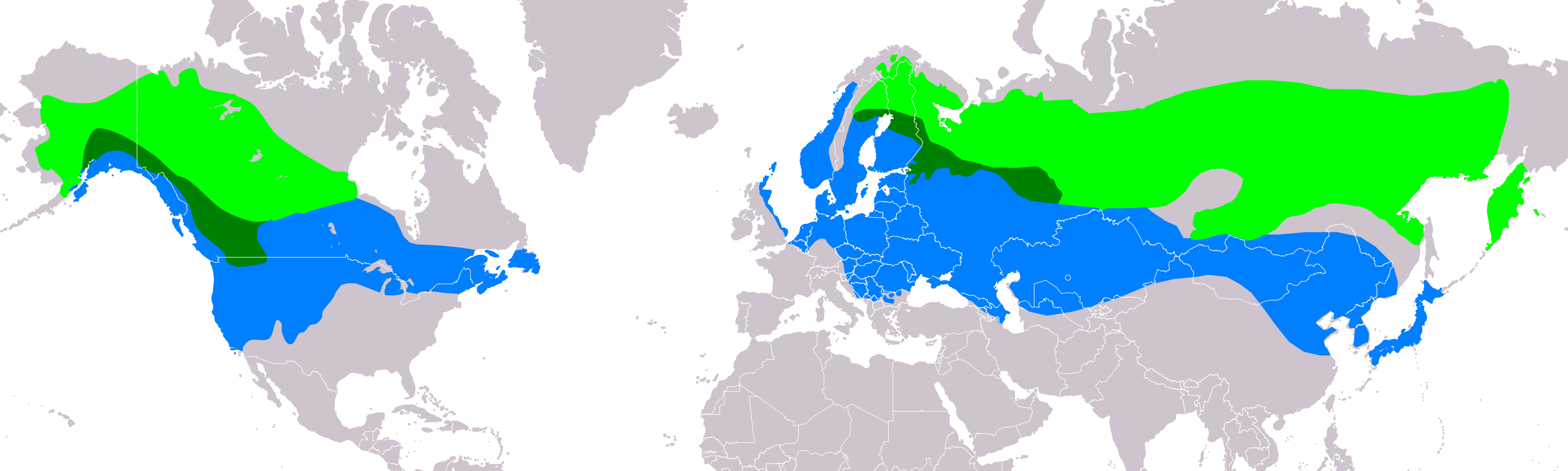
- Range of B. garrulus Breeding Resident Non-breeding (All ranges are approximate, and many birds occur outside the main wintering range even in non-irruption years.)

Synonyms
- Lanius garrulus Linnaeus, 1758; Ampelis garrulus Linnaeus, 1766

= Bohemian waxwing =

Passerine bird from Eurasia and North America

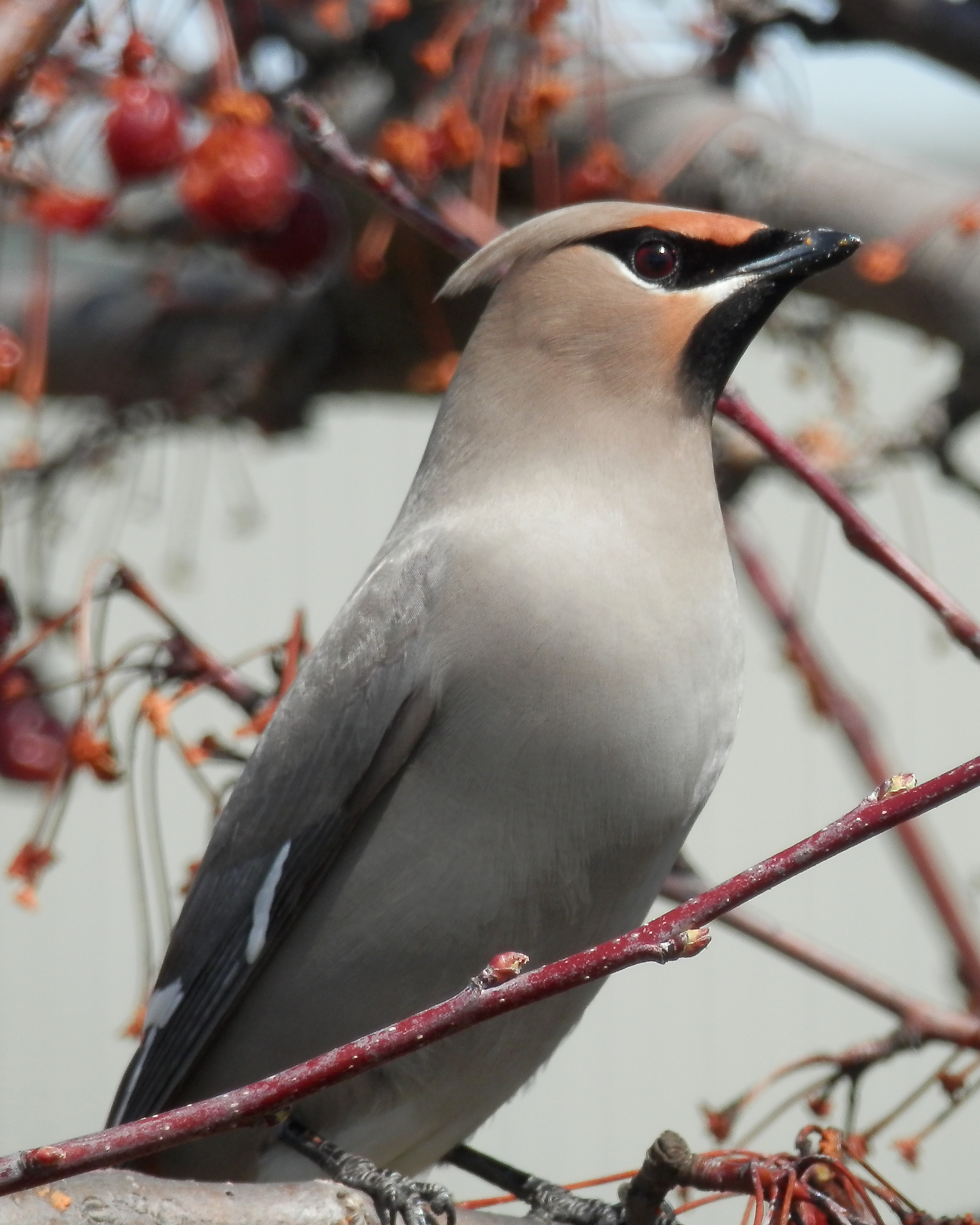
B. g. pallidiceps in Ontario, Canada

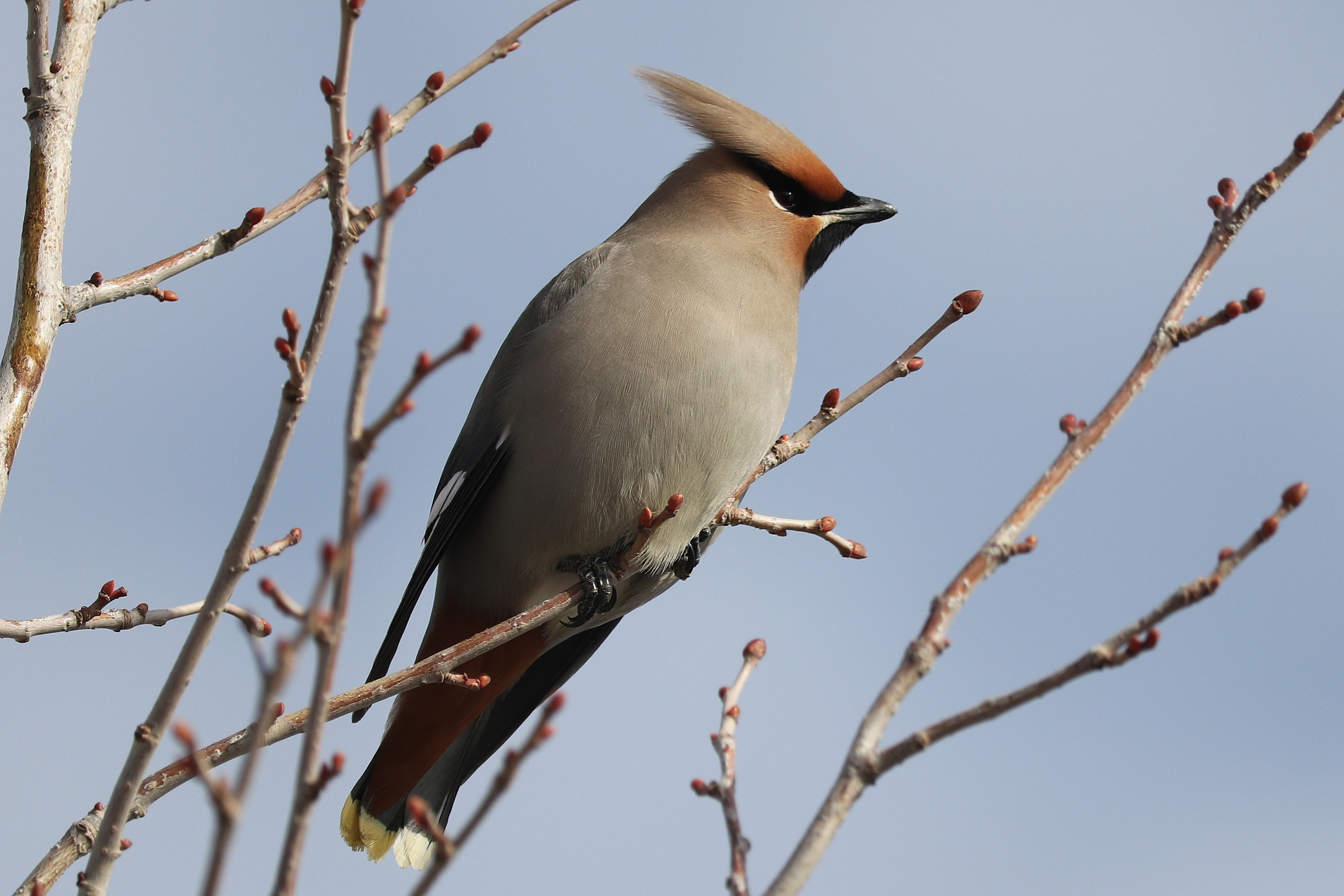
B. g. pallidiceps female in Saskatchewan Canada.

The Bohemian waxwing (Bombycilla garrulus) is a starling-sized passerine bird that breeds in the northern forests of the Palearctic and North America. It has mainly buff-grey plumage, black face markings and a pointed crest. Its wings are patterned with white and bright yellow, and some of the wing feathers have red tips, the resemblance of which to sealing wax gives these birds their common name. The two or three subspecies show only minor differences in appearance. Females are similar to males, although young birds are less well-marked and have few or no waxy wingtips. Although the Bohemian waxwing's range overlaps those of the cedar and Japanese waxwings, it is easily distinguished from them by size and plumage differences.

The breeding habitat is coniferous forests, usually near water. The pair build a lined cup-shaped nest in a tree or bush, often close to the trunk. The clutch of 3–7 eggs is incubated by the female alone for 13–14 days to hatching. The chicks are altricial and naked, and are fed by both parents, initially mostly with insects, but thereafter mainly fruit. They fledge about 14–16 days after leaving the egg. Many birds desert their nesting range in winter and migrate farther south. In some years, large numbers of Bohemian waxwings irrupt well beyond their normal winter range in search of the fruit that makes up most of their diet.

Waxwings can be very tame in winter, entering towns and gardens in search of food, rowan berries being a particular favourite. They can metabolise alcohol produced in fermenting fruit, but can still become intoxicated, sometimes fatally. Other hazards include predation by birds of prey, infestation by parasites, and collisions with cars or windows. The large numbers and very large breeding area mean that it is classified as being of least concern by the International Union for Conservation of Nature.

== Taxonomy ==
The waxwings are a family, Bombycillidae, of short-tailed stocky birds with soft plumage, a head crest and distinctively patterned wings and tails. There are three species, the Bohemian, cedar, and Japanese waxwings. DNA studies and shared features such as a relatively large size, grey underparts and similar undertail patterns suggest that the Japanese and Bohemian waxwings are most closely related within the genus. Although only the cedar and Bohemian waxwings normally have red tips on their wing feathers, this feature is occasionally shown by the Japanese waxwing, suggesting that this was originally a whole-family characteristic that has been lost in one species, rather than an indicator of a close relationship. DNA analysis confirms that the cedar waxwing diverged early from the other members of the family. Outside the genus, the closest relatives of the waxwings are believed to be the silky-flycatchers, the palmchat, and the grey hypocolius, all of which have sometimes been included in the Bombycillidae.

The Bohemian waxwing was described by Carl Linnaeus in his 1758 10th edition of Systema Naturae as Lanius Garrulus. The waxwings were moved to their own genus, Bombycilla, by Louis Pierre Vieillot in 1808. (Note: The apparent discrepancy between Vieillot's book publication date, 1807, and the date of the genus attribution in standard sources, 1808, arises because the book was published in monthly installments over a two-year period between 1807 and 1809.) Bombycilla, the genus name, is Vieillot's attempt at Latin for "silktail", translating the German name Seidenschwänze. Vieillot thought that motacilla, Latin for wagtails, was derived from mota for "move" and cilla, which he thought meant "tail"; however, Motacilla actually combines motacis, a mover, with the diminutive suffix -illa. He then combined this "cilla" with the Latin bombyx, meaning silk. The species name garrulus is the Latin for talkative and was applied to this bird, as "Garrulus Bohemicus", by Conrad Gessner in 1555; the term is a reference to a supposed likeness to the Eurasian jay (Garrulus glandarius) rather than to the waxwing's vocalisations. The English name "waxwing" refers to the bright red tips of the secondary feathers on its wings, which look like drops of sealing wax, while "Bohemian" follows Gessner's usage, and may refer to the Romani, alluding to the bird's wanderings, or to its presumed origin from Bohemia. The spellings "Waxwing" and "Bohemian waxwing" were first recorded in 1817, the former as a reference to Vieillot's separation of this bird from the "chatterers".

There are two or three recognised subspecies:

- B. g. garrulus (Linnaeus, 1758): the nominate subspecies, breeds in northern Europe from northern Norway east to the Ural Mountains.
- B. g. centralasiae (Polyakov, 1915): breeds from the Urals eastwards across northern Asia. Included in B. g. garrulus by IOC.
- B. g. pallidiceps (Reichenow, 1908): breeds in northwestern North America.

The differences between these forms are small and clinal, and the species could be possibly considered as monotypic. The fossil record includes Pleistocene deposits from the UK and the Carpathian Mountains.

== Description ==
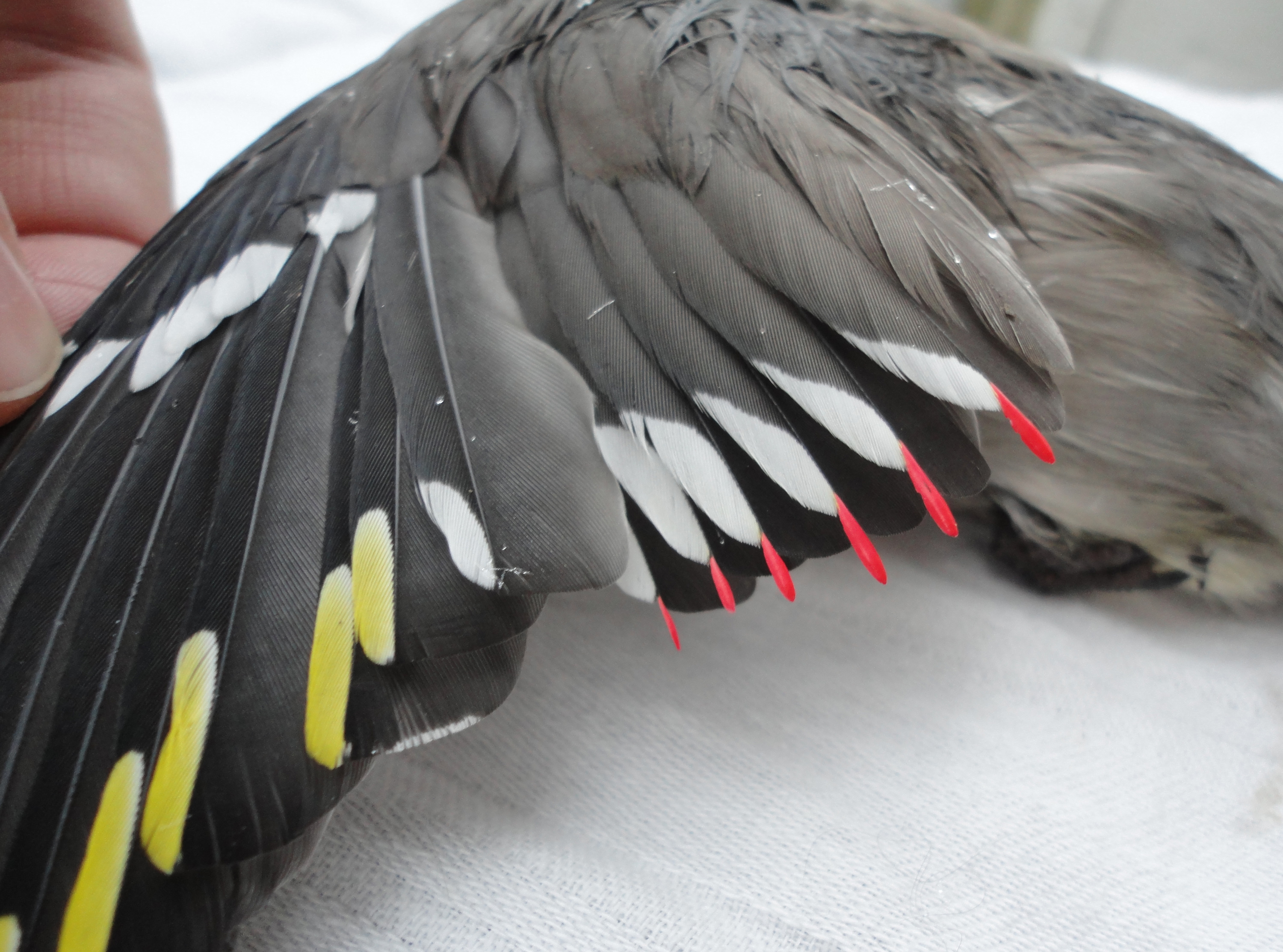
The distinctive red wing tips

The Bohemian waxwing is a starling-sized bird 19–23 cm (7.5–9.1 in) in length with a 32–35.5 cm (12.6–14.0 in) wingspan, and an average weight of 55 g (1.9 oz). It is short-tailed, mainly brownish-grey, and has a conspicuous crest on its head. The male of the nominate subspecies has a black mask through the eye and a black throat. There is a white streak behind the bill and a white curve below the eye. The lower belly is a rich chestnut colour and there are cinnamon-coloured areas around the mask. The rump is grey and the tail ends in a bright yellow band with a broad black border above it. The wings are very distinctive; the flight feathers are black and the primaries in adults have markings that produce a yellow stripe and white "fishhooks" on the closed wing. The adult's secondaries end in long red appendages with the sealing wax appearance that gives the bird its English name. The eyes are dark brown, the bill is mainly black, and the legs are dark grey or black. In flight, the waxwing's large flocks, long wings and short tail give some resemblance to the common starling, and its flight is similarly fast and direct. It clambers easily through bushes and trees but only shuffles on the ground.

In adults, the primary feathers have a bright yellow leading edge near the tip, and a white 'tick mark' on the tip of the trailing edge. In males, the yellow tail tip is 6–11 mm broad, the black throat is sharply defined, and there are 6–8 red waxy tips on the secondaries. Females are very similar to males, but have a narrower (4–8 mm) yellow terminal band to the tail, a less defined lower edge to the black throat and slightly fewer red tips, 5–7, on the secondaries. First-winter birds are easily distinguished from adults by the tips of the primaries, which have a white or only very pale yellow leading edge, and no white 'tick mark' on the trailing edge; they also have a slightly narrower yellow tail tip (5–10 mm in males, 2–6 mm in females), and fewer red wax tips on the secondaries, 4–6(–8) in males and (0–)1–5 in females. The juvenile plumage, only seen on the far northern breeding grounds, is markedly duller than adult plumage, with streaky, whiter underparts, no black on the throat, and a smaller black face mask; juveniles moult into first-winter plumage soon after fledging, before the end of the summer.

Compared to the nominate subspecies, eastern B. g. centralasiae is paler, greyer and has little reddish-brown behind the bill. The American subspecies B. g. pallidiceps has more colouring on the cheeks and forehead than the nominate form and is otherwise generally duller in appearance.

Flight sound

The soft, dense feathers are kept in good condition by preening. The red waxy tips are the extended and flattened ends of feather shafts, pigmented with astaxanthin and enclosed in a transparent sheath. A study of the cedar waxwings showed that the red tips are few or absent until the third year of life for that related species. All adult waxwings have a complete moult annually between August and January. Juveniles moult at the same time but retain their flight and some other wing feathers.

The range of the Bohemian waxwing overlaps those of both the other members of the genus. The cedar waxwing is smaller than the Bohemian; it has browner upperparts, a white undertail and a white line above the black eye patch, and lacks the white and yellow marks on the wings. Adult cedar waxwings have a yellowish belly, and all ages have less strongly patterned wings than the Bohemian waxwing. The Japanese waxwing is easily distinguished from its relatives; it has a red terminal band to the tail, the black mask extends up the rear of the crest, and there is no yellow stripe and few or no red tips on the wings.

The Bohemian waxwing's call is a high trill sirrrr. It is less wavering and lower-pitched than that of the cedar waxwing, and longer and lower-pitched than the call of the Japanese waxwing. Other calls are just variants of the main vocalisation; a quieter version is used by chicks to call parents, and courtship calls, also given during nest construction, have a particularly large frequency range. Although not a call as such, when a flock takes off or lands, the wings make a distinctive rattling sound that can be heard 30 m (98 ft) away.

== Distribution and habitat ==
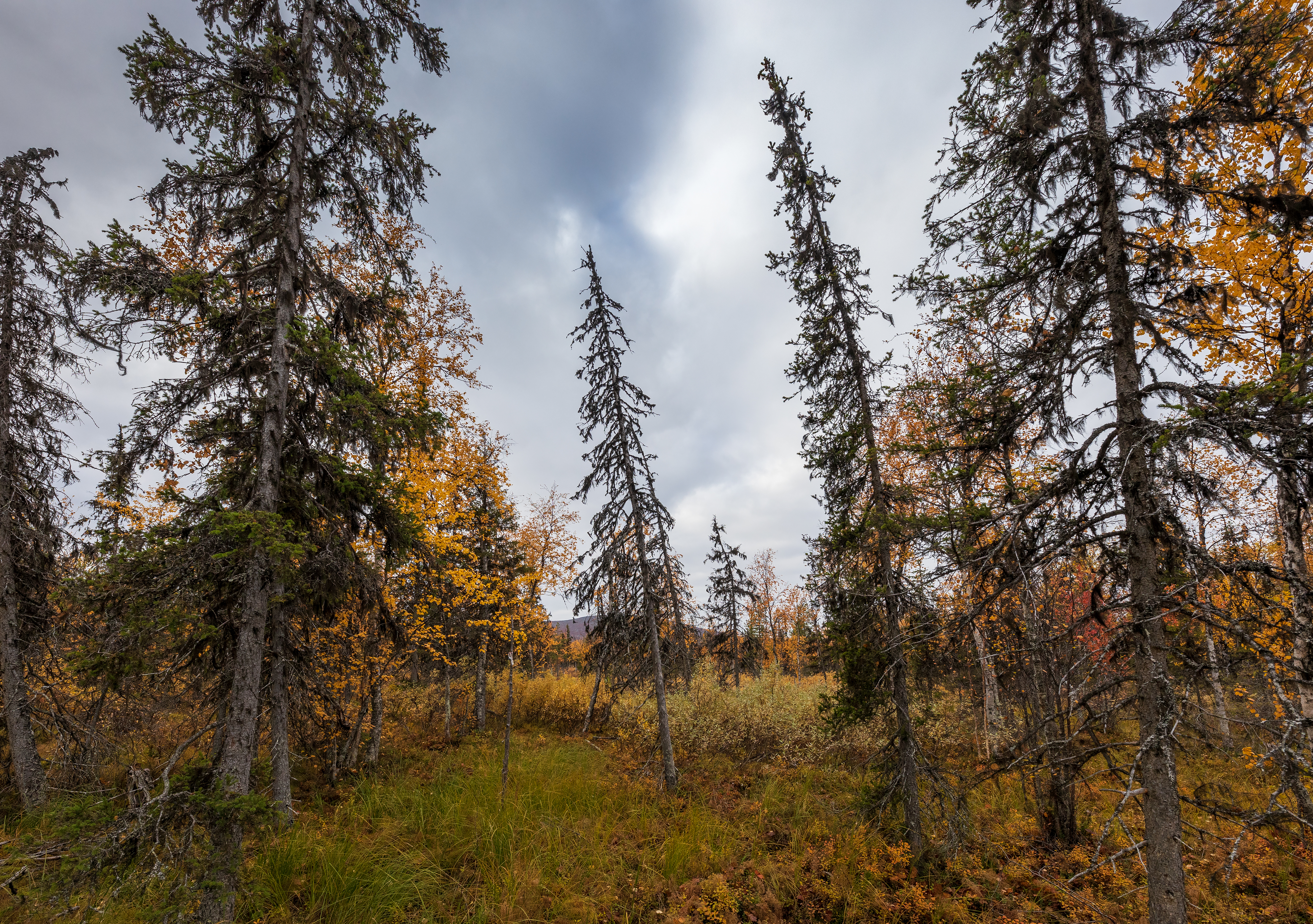
Northern coniferous forest breeding habitat.

The Bohemian waxwing has a circumpolar distribution, breeding in northern regions of Eurasia and North America. In Eurasia, its northern nesting limit is just short of the treeline, roughly at the 10 °C July isotherm, and it breeds south locally to about 51°N. Most birds breed between 60–67°N, reaching 70°N in Scandinavia. The North American subspecies breeds in the northwestern and north central areas of the continent, its range extending southwards beyond the US border in the Rocky Mountains.

This waxwing is migratory with much of the breeding range abandoned as the birds move south for the winter. Migration starts in September in the north of the range, a month or so later farther south. Eurasian birds normally winter from eastern Britain through northern parts of western and central Europe, Ukraine, Kazakhstan and northern China to Japan. North American breeders have a more southeasterly trend, many birds wintering in southeast Canada, with smaller numbers in the north central and northeastern US states. Birds do not usually return to the same wintering sites in successive years. One bird wintering in Ukraine was found 6,000 km (3,700 mi) to the east in Siberia in the following year.

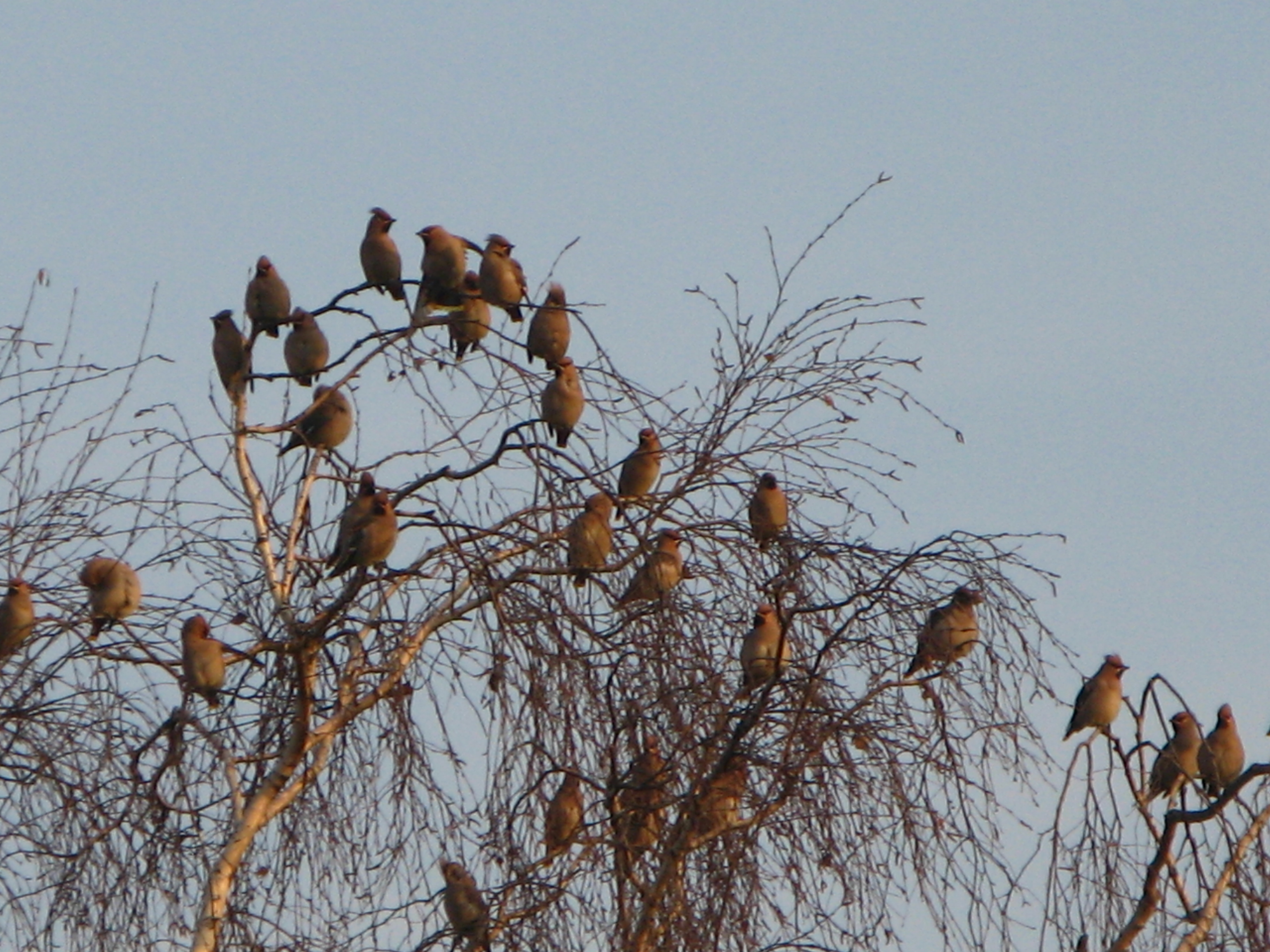
A winter flock in Poland

In some years, this waxwing irrupts south of its normal wintering areas, sometimes in huge numbers. The fruit on which the birds depend in winter varies in abundance from year to year, and in poor years, particularly those following a good crop the previous year, the flocks move farther south until they reach adequate supplies. They will stay until the food runs out and move on again. In what may be the largest ever irruption in Europe, in the winter of 2004–2005, more than half a million waxwings were recorded in Germany alone. This invasion followed an unusually warm, dry breeding season. In 1908, an American flock 60–90 m (200–300 ft) wide was noted as taking two to three minutes to fly over.

The breeding habitat is mature conifers, often spruce although other conifers and broadleaf trees may also be present. More open, wet areas such as lakes and peat swamps with dead and drowned trees are used for feeding on insects. Lowlands, valleys and uplands are used in Eurasia, although mountains tend to be avoided. However, the North American subspecies nests in Canada at altitudes between 900–1,550 m (2,950–5,090 ft). Outside the breeding season, the waxwing will occupy a wide range of habitats as long as suitable fruit such as rowan are available. It may be found by roads, in parks and gardens or along hedges or woodlands edges. It shows little fear of humans at this time. In winter, waxwings roost communally in dense trees or hedges, sometimes with American robins, fieldfares or other wintering species.

== Behaviour ==
=== Breeding ===
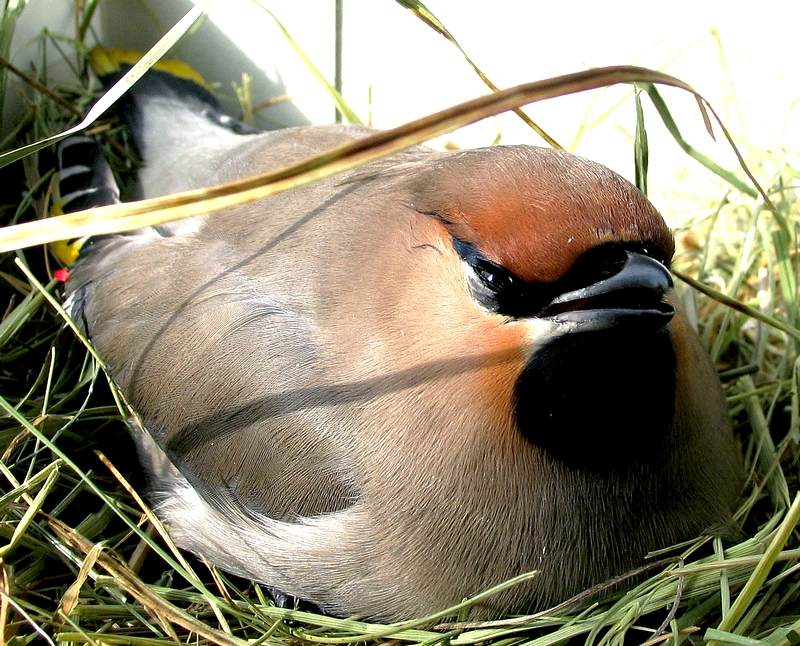
Female on nest

Bohemian waxwings start their return from the wintering grounds in February or March, but northern breeders do not reach their breeding areas until April or early May. This monogamous species nests mainly from mid-June to July.

Waxwings are not highly territorial, and, although normally solitary breeders, several pairs may nest close together where there are a number of good nest sites. Males may sometimes deter rivals from approaching their mates, and females may squabble over nest sites. Aggression is shown by sleeking down the feathers and crest, showing the black throat, and opening the bill. The breeding display is almost the opposite of this; the male erects his body and crest feathers, and turns his head away from the female. The male may repeatedly present a gift of a small item, often food, to his partner, placing it in her open bill. In about 90% of cases, this display does not lead to copulation. Older males have more red tips to the wings and are preferred by females.

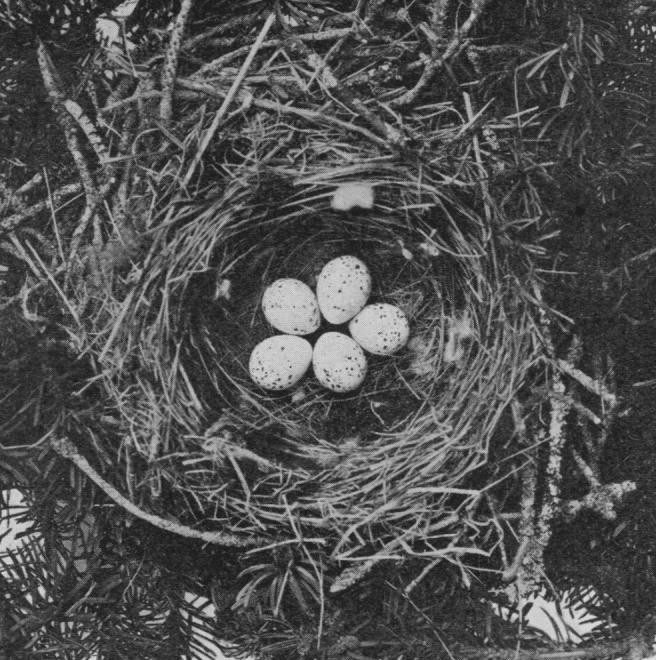
Nest and eggs

The nest, built by both sexes, is a cup of thin twigs lined with softer material such as fine grass, moss, fur or lichen. It is constructed 1.3–15 m (4–50 ft) above the ground in a pine or scrub, commonly close to the trunk. The eggs are a glossy pale blue spotted with black and grey and the clutch is 3–7 eggs, although five or six is most common. The average size of the egg is 24 mm × 18 mm (0.94 in × 0.71 in), and it weighs 3.8 g (0.13 oz), of which 5% is shell. The eggs are incubated for 13–14 days by the female alone. She is fed regurgitated berries by her mate, and rarely leaves the nest. The chicks are altricial and naked, and have bright red mouths; they are fed by both parents, although the male brings most of the food, mainly insects, in the first few days. The young are subsequently fed largely with fruit. The chicks fledge about 14–16 days after hatching. They are fed by the adults for about two weeks after fledging.

Breeding densities of this waxwing are typically low compared to other passerines, usually less than ten birds per square kilometre (26 per square mile) even in good habitat, although up to 35·6 birds per square kilometre (92 per square mile) have been found in Russia. One brood each year is normal. Maximum recorded ages are 5 years 10 months in North America and more than 13 years 6 months in Europe. The average life expectancy is unknown. Significant causes of death include predation, collisions with windows and cars, and poisoning by road salt consumed when drinking.

=== Feeding ===
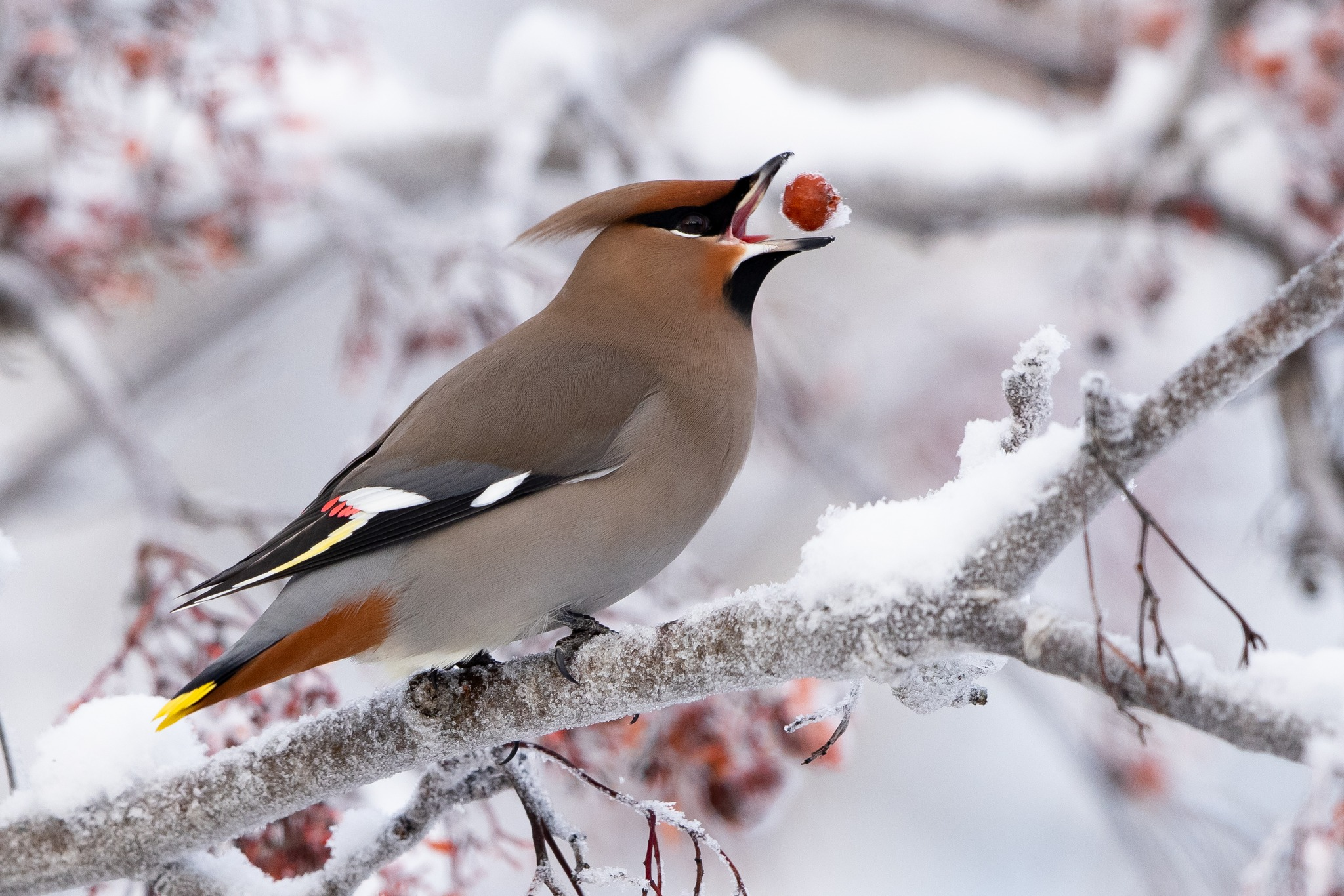
Eating a berry, Kenai National Wildlife Refuge, Alaska

Waxwings are primarily fruit eaters in the winter, and consume insects when available, particularly during the breeding season but also on any mild days in autumn and winter. Mosquitoes and midges are the most common prey, but many other insects and some spiders are eaten. They are caught mainly by flycatching from an open perch, but some, particularly aphids, may be picked off vegetation. Fruit is normally picked from trees, sometimes from the ground, and is usually swallowed whole. In the summer, Vaccinium and Rubus species and Canada buffaloberry are important items of their diet, while cotoneaster, juniper, haws, rose hips and apples predominate outside the breeding season. Rowan berries are a favourite food, and are eaten whenever available.

Waxwings can eat huge numbers of berries, each bird sometimes consuming several hundred a day, more than double its own weight. One individual was recorded as eating between 600 and 1,000 cotoneaster berries in six hours, and defecating every four minutes. Waxwings travel significant distances when feeding and help to disperse the fruit seeds. Waxwings forage in large flocks, sometimes of several hundred birds, which enables them to overwhelm birds such as mistle thrushes attempting to defend their fruit trees.

Fruit is rich in sugar but deficient in other nutrients, so it must be eaten in large quantities. Bohemian waxwings have a large liver which helps to convert sugar to energy. They can metabolise ethanol produced from the fermentation of those sugary fruit more efficiently than humans, but may still become intoxicated, sometimes fatally. Waxwings often drink water or eat snow in winter, since the sugar in their fruit diet tends to dehydrate the birds through an osmotic effect. In the summer, many fruit species are juicier, and water is less of a problem.

In the past, the arrival of waxwings sometimes coincided with epidemics of cholera or plague, and led to the old Dutch and Flemish name Pestvogel, "plague bird". The juniper berries on which they fed were thought to offer protection, and people consumed the fruit and burned branches to fumigate their houses.

== Predators and parasites ==
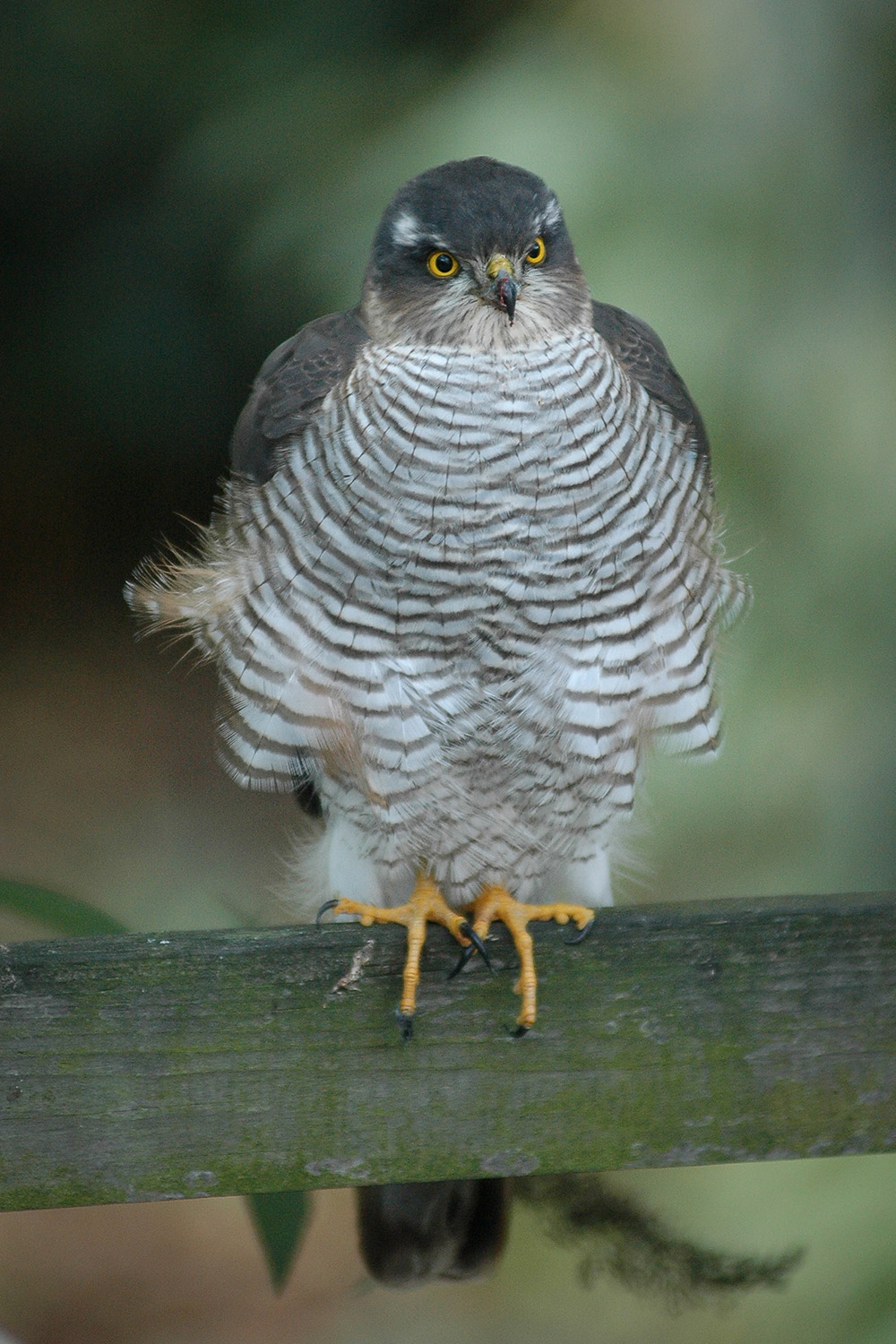
The Eurasian sparrowhawk hunts Bohemian waxwings.

Waxwings are preyed upon by birds of prey including rough-legged buzzards, Eurasian sparrowhawks, prairie falcons, and great grey shrikes. Merlins attack winter flocks, including those in cities. When alarmed, Bohemian waxwings "freeze" with bill and neck pointing upwards. If this fails, they fly, calling noisily.

Bohemian waxwings are not brood parasitised by the common cuckoo or its relatives in Eurasia because the cuckoo's young cannot survive on a largely fruit diet. In North America, the waxwing's breeding range has little overlap with brown-headed cowbird, another parasitic species. Nevertheless, eggs of other birds placed in a Bohemian waxwing's nest are always rejected. This suggests that in the past, perhaps 3 million years ago, the ancestral waxwing was a host of a brood parasitic species, and retains the rejection behaviour acquired then.

Parasitic mites include Syringophiloidus bombycillae, first identified on this species, and the nasal mite Ptilonyssus bombycillae. Blood parasites include Trypanosoma species, and a Leucocytozoon first identified in this waxwing. Bohemian waxwings may carry flatworms and tapeworms, but levels of parasitic worm infestation are generally low.

== Status ==
The global population of the Bohemian waxwing has been estimated at more than three million birds, and the breeding range covers about 12.8 million km^{2} (4.9 million mi^{2}). Although this species' population, as of 2013, appears to be declining, the decrease is not rapid nor large enough to trigger conservation vulnerability criteria. Given its high numbers and huge breeding area, this waxwing is therefore classified by the International Union for Conservation of Nature as being of least concern. The woodlands used by this species are well to the north of major human populations, and the birds can use disturbed habitats, so there are no serious long-term threats to this species.

== Gallery ==
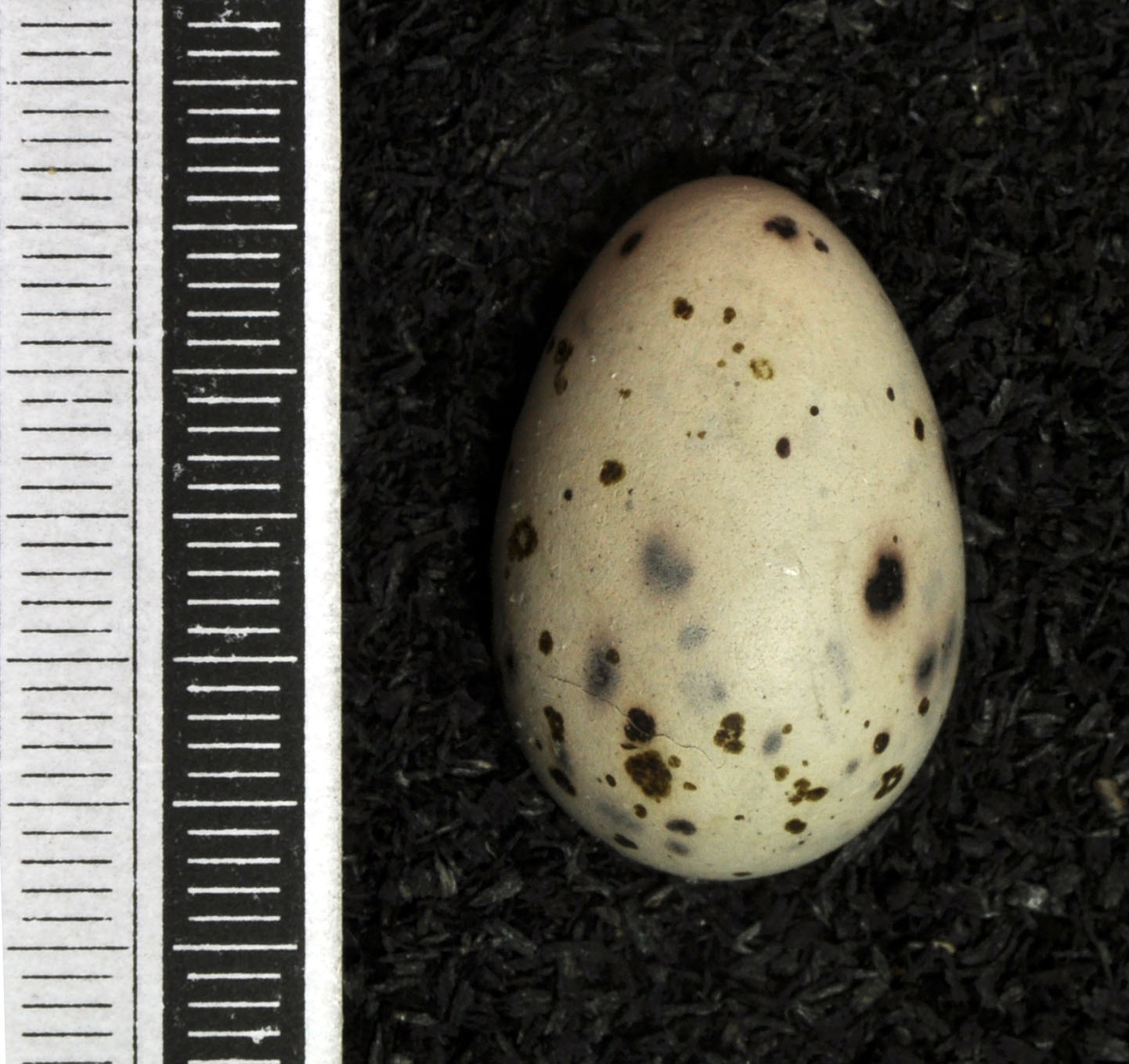
Egg, Collection Museum Wiesbaden

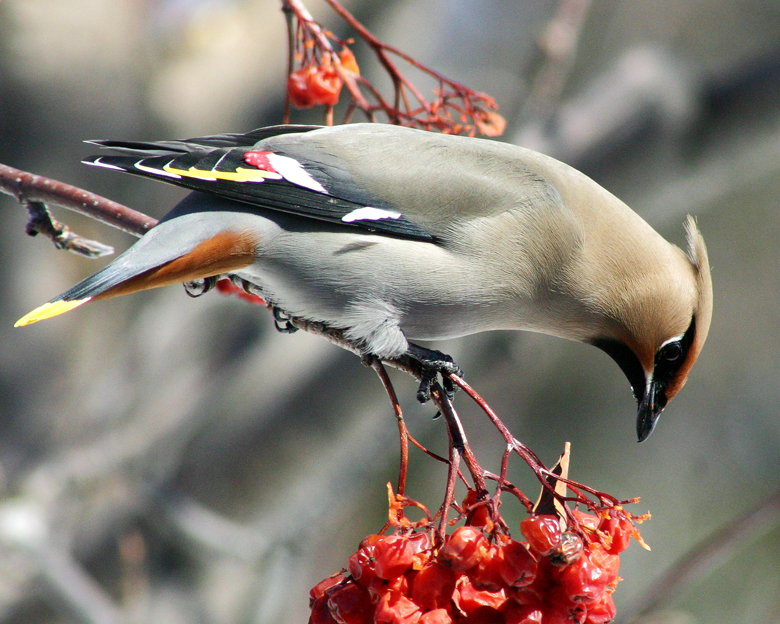
Feeding on rowan

== Cited texts ==
- Brazil, Mark (2009). Birds of East Asia. London: A & C Black. ISBN 978-0-7136-7040-0.
- Campbell, Robert Wayne; Canadian Wildlife Service (1997). The Birds of British Columbia: Passerines (Flycatchers Through Vireos). Vancouver: University of British Columbia. ISBN 978-0-7748-0572-8.
- Cocker, Mark; Mabey, Richard (2005). Birds Britannica. London: Chatto & Windus. ISBN 978-0-7011-6907-7.
- Főzy, István; Szente, István (2013). Fossils of the Carpathian Region. Bloomington, Indiana: Indiana University Press. ISBN 978-0-253-00987-6.
- Gessner, Conrad (1555). Icones avium omnium, quae in Historia avium Conradi Gesneri describuntur: cum nomenclaturis singulorum latinis, italicis, gallicis et germanicis plerunque, per certos ordines digestae (in Latin). Zurich: C Froschoverus.
- Holloway, Joel Ellis (2003). Dictionary of Birds of the United States: Scientific and Common Names. Portland, Oregon: Timber Press. ISBN 978-0-88192-600-2.
- Jobling, James A (2010). The Helm Dictionary of Scientific Bird Names. London: Christopher Helm. ISBN 978-1-4081-2501-4.
- Linnaeus, Carl (1758). Systema naturae per regna tria naturae, secundum classes, ordines, genera, species, cum characteribus, differentiis, synonymis, locis. Tomus I. Editio decima, reformata (in Latin). Holmiae: Laurentii Salvii.
- Mayr, Ernst; Greenway, James C (1960). Checklist of Birds of the World: A continuation of the work of James L Peters. Vol. IX. Cambridge, Massachusetts: Museum of Comparative Zoology.
- Mullarney, Killian; Svensson, Lars; Zetterström, Dan; Grant, Peter J (2009). Collins Bird Guide (2nd ed.). London: Collins. ISBN 978-0-00-726726-2.
- Newton, Ian (2010). Bird Migration (Collins New Naturalist Library 113). London: Collins. ISBN 978-0-00-730732-6.
- Rausch, Robert L. "Biology of Avian Parasites: Helminthes" in Farner, Donald S; King, James R; Parkes, Kenneth C (1983). Avian Biology, Volume 7. New York: Academic Press. ISBN 978-0-12-412020-4.
- Semenchuk, Glen Peter (1992). The Atlas of Breeding Birds of Alberta. Edmonton, Alberta: Federation of Alberta Naturalists. ISBN 978-0-9696134-0-4.
- Sibley, David (2000). The North American Bird Guide. Robertsbridge, Sussex: Pica Press. ISBN 978-1-873403-98-3.
- Snow, David; Perrins, Christopher M, eds. (1998). The Birds of the Western Palearctic concise edition (2 volumes). Oxford: Oxford University Press. ISBN 978-0-19-854099-1.
- Snow, Barbara; Snow, David (2010). Birds and Berries (Poyser Monographs). London: Poyser. ISBN 978-1-4081-3821-2.
- Vieillot, Louis Pierre (1807). Histoire naturelle des oiseaux de l'Amérique Septentrionale. Volume 1 (in French). Paris: Desray. doi:10.3931/e-rara-7221.
- Willughby, Francis; Ray, John (1678). The ornithology of Francis Willughby of Middleton in the county of Warwick. London: John Martyn.
