= Cedar waxwing =

Cedar waxwing Temporal range: Pleistocene–present
- Cedar waxwing in New York, US

Conservation status
- Least Concern (IUCN 3.1)

Scientific classification
- Kingdom: Animalia
- Phylum: Chordata
- Class: Aves
- Order: Passeriformes
- Family: Bombycillidae
- Genus: Bombycilla
- Species: B. cedrorum

Binomial name
- Bombycilla cedrorum Vieillot, 1808
- Cedar waxwing range Breeding range Year-round range Wintering range

Synonyms
- Ampelis cedrorum

Audio
- Song

Species of bird

Young birds do not have the waxy red wing tips

The cedar waxwing (Bombycilla cedrorum) is a member of the family Bombycillidae or waxwing family of passerine birds. It is a medium-sized bird that is mainly brown, gray, and yellow. Some of the wing feathers have red tips, which resemble sealing wax, giving the bird its common name. It is a native of North and Central America, breeding in open wooded areas in southern Canada and wintering in the southern half of the United States, Central America, and the far northwest of South America. Its diet includes cedar cones, fruit, holly berries, and insects. The cedar waxwing is listed as least concern on the IUCN Red List.

== Taxonomy ==
The three species of waxwings were moved to their own genus, Bombycilla, by Louis Pierre Vieillot in 1808. (Note: The apparent discrepancy between Vieillot's book publication date, 1807, and the date of the genus attribution in standard sources, 1808, arises because the book was published in monthly installments over a two-year period between 1807 and 1809.) Bombycilla is Vieillot's attempt at Latin for "silktail", translating the German name Seidenschwänze. Vieillot thought that motacilla, Latin for wagtails, was derived from mota for "move" and cilla, which he thought meant "tail"; however, Motacilla actually combines motacis, a mover, with the diminutive suffix -illa. He then combined this "cilla" with the Latin bombyx, meaning silk. The specific epithet cedrorum is Latin for "of the cedars".

== Description ==
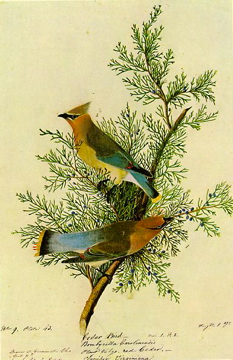
Audubon's illustration

Cedar waxwings are medium-sized birds around 6–7 in (15–18 cm) long and weighing roughly 30 g (1 oz). Wingspan ranges from 8.7 to 11.8 in (22 to 30 cm). They are smaller and browner than their close relative, the Bohemian waxwing (which breeds farther to the north and west). Their markings are a "silky, shiny collection of brown, gray, and lemon-yellow, accented with a subdued crest, rakish black mask, and brilliant-red wax droplets on the wing feathers." These droplets may be the same colour as the madrone berries they are known to eat. These birds' most prominent feature is this small cluster of red, wax-like droplets on tips of secondary flight feathers on the wings, a feature they share with the Bohemian waxwing (but not the Japanese waxwing). These wax-like droplets are attributed to the pigmented and medullary layers of the secondary tip being surrounded by a transparent cuticle. The wings are "broad and pointed, like a starling's." The tail is typically yellow or orange depending on diet. Birds that have fed on berries of introduced Eurasian honeysuckles while growing tail feathers have darker orange-tipped tail feathers. The tail is somewhat short and square-tipped. Adults have a pale yellow belly. The waxwing's crest often "lies flat and droops over the back of the head." It has a short and wide bill. The waxwing's black mask has a thin, white border. Immature birds are streaked on the throat and flanks and often do not have the black mask of the adults. Males and females look alike.

The flight of waxwings is strong and direct, and the movement of the flock in flight resembles that of a flock of small, pale European starlings. Cedar waxwings fly at 40 km/h (25 mph) at an altitude up to 610 m (2,000 ft).

Cedar waxwings are also known as the southern waxwing, Canada robin, cedar bird, cherry bird, or recellet.

The oldest observed cedar waxwing was eight years and two months old.

=== Vocalizations ===
The two common calls of these birds include very high-pitched whistles and buzzy trills about a half-second long, often represented as see or sree. Its call can also be described as "high, thin, whistles." They call often, especially in flight.

High-pitched vocalizations

== Distribution and habitat ==
Their preferred habitat consists of trees at the edge of wooded areas or forests, especially those that provide access to berry sources, as well as water. They are frequently seen in fruiting trees. Waxwings are attracted to the sound of running water and like to bathe in and drink from shallow creeks. In urban or suburban environments, waxwings often favour parkland with well-spaced trees; golf courses, cemeteries, or other landscaping with well-spaced trees; bushes that provide berries; and a nearby water source such as a fountain or birdbath. Also, look for them near farms, orchards, and gardens, particularly those with fruiting trees or shrubs.

Outside the breeding season, cedar waxwings often feed in large flocks numbering hundreds of birds. This species is nomadic and irruptive, with erratic winter movements, though most of the population migrates farther south into the United States and beyond, sometimes reaching as far as northern South America. They move in huge numbers if berry supplies are low. Rare vagrants have reached western Europe, and seven cedar waxwing sightings have been reported in the United Kingdom. Individual Bohemian waxwings occasionally join large winter flocks of cedar waxwings.

== Behavior and ecology ==
Cedar waxwings are sociable, seen in flocks year round. They are nonterritorial birds and "will often groom each other." They move from place to place depending on where they can find good sources of berries.

=== Breeding ===
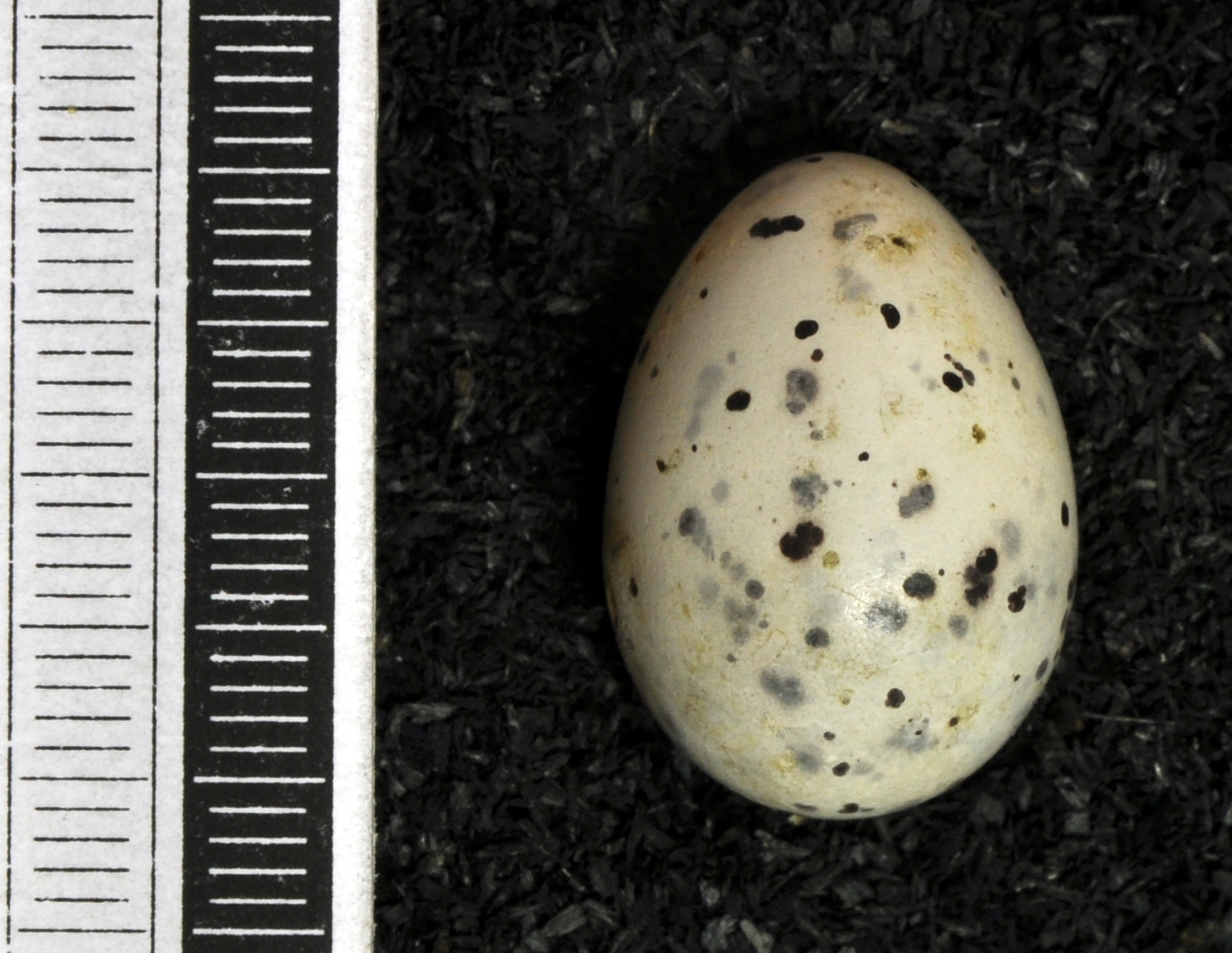
Egg, Collection Museum Wiesbaden

The mating season for this bird begins around the end of spring and runs through to late summer. The male does a "hopping dance" for the female. If she is interested, she will hop back. During courtship, the male and female sit together and pass small objects back and forth, such as flower petals or an insect. Mating pairs sometimes rub their beaks together. The nest is a loose, open cup built with grass and twigs, lined with softer materials, and supported by a tree branch averaging 2 to 6 m (6.6 to 19.7 ft) above ground, but at times considerably higher. Around five or six days are needed for the female waxwing to build the nest, with up to 2,500 trips back and forth. Sometimes, the female steals nest material from other species' nests. The outer diameter of the nest is about 12 to 16 cm (4.7 to 6.3 in). Usually, five or six eggs are laid, and the female incubates them for 11 to 13 days. The eggs are oval-shaped with a smooth surface and very little, if any, gloss. The eggshells are of various shades of light or bluish grey with irregular, dark brown spots or greyish-brown splotches. Both parents build the nest and feed the young. Typically, one or two broods are raised during the mating season. Young leave the nest about 14 to 18 days after hatching.

=== Diet ===
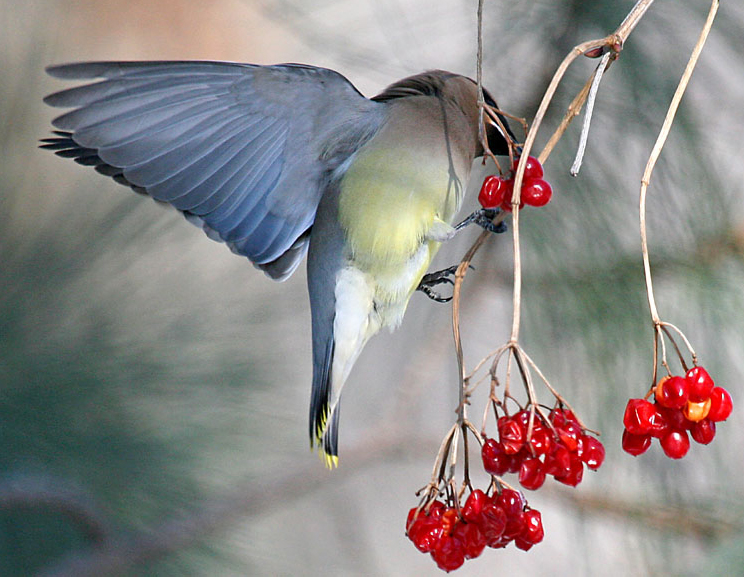
Eating berries

Cedar waxwings eat berries and sugary fruit year-round, including dogwood, serviceberry, cedar, juniper, hawthorn, and winterberry, with insects becoming an important part of the diet in the breeding season. Their fondness for the small cones of the eastern redcedar (a kind of juniper) gave these birds their common name. They eat berries whole. They sometimes fly over water to catch insects. Cedar waxwings are sometimes responsible for significant damage to commercial fruit farms, thus can be considered as pests, especially because they feed in large groups.

When the end of a twig holds a supply of berries that only one bird at a time can reach, members of a flock may line up along the twig and pass berries beak-to-beak down the line so that each bird gets a chance to eat.

Sometimes, cedar waxwings eat fruit that is overripe and has begun to ferment, intoxicating the bird.

=== Digestion ===
Cedar waxwings are a highly specialized frugivorous species, exhibiting almost full reliance on sugary fruits, unlike other fruit-eating passerines that exhibit only opportunistic frugivory when other food sources are in poor supply. Their efficient digestion of fruits containing simple sugars allows them to live on fruit alone, while other fruit-eating passerines found subsisting on fruit alone to be fatal. Reliance on primarily fruit alone occurs until fruit cessation in the spring when the birds start to feed on insects and flowers. In such cases, intestinal analysis revealed stomach contents of 84% fruit, 12% invertebrates, and 4% flowers, among 212 individuals involved in the study.

Despite the advantage of frugivorous specialization, they did lose body mass when experimentally fed one fruit type alone (Viburnum opulus), but gained body mass when fed pollen-rich catkins, as well (Populus deltoides). Many fleshy fruits are energy-rich, but they are deficient in the protein levels required by cedar waxwings (1.7%). The nutrient deficit of sugary fruits alone is mitigated through flower and subsequent pollen consumption that is rich in protein. This response to food diversity illustrates the importance of multiple food sources to acquire the precise nutrients needed to maintain bodily metabolism.

Though waxwings displayed efficient rates of digestion, they also exhibited relatively quick passage rates that are indicative of their low use efficiency (36.5%), as fruit skins appeared undigested in feces. The low use efficiency of fruits digested by cedar waxwings not only indicates the necessity of consuming large quantities of fruits, but viable seeds found in feces also suggest the important role they may play in seed dispersal.

The presence of seeds in feces is also indicative of the digestive limitations associated with eating seed-rich fruits, specifically fruits laden with smaller seeds that pass much more slowly through the digestive tract. A positive correlation between seed defecation and fruit consumption is seen as rates of ingestion increased only when rates of seed processing also increased. When seeds were observed being regurgitated or expelled, activity and ingestion increased as opposed to when seeds were consumed and passed through the digestive tract, limiting further activity and foraging in which waxwings exhibited a period of "loafing" characterized by stretches of inactivity after a meal. This limitation of fruit processing poses potential issues for cedar waxwings observed consuming nutrient-poor fruits and their seeds, as the ingestion of seeds prevents them from increasing consumption efforts to mitigate this low-quality diet.

Ingestion of seeds by cedar waxwings is alleviated via efficient rates of seed processing in which seeds are separated from and defecated before the pulp of the fruit. This allows them to still exhibit relatively high digestion efficiencies in spite of the gut processing limitations that are associated with eating seeds. The digestive strategies employed by these birds allow them to subsist on a predominately fruit-based diet.

== Conservation status ==
Waxwings are evaluated as least concern on the IUCN Red List of Endangered Species. Populations are increasing in their range partly because fields are being allowed to grow into forests and shrublands, and fruiting trees such as mountain ash are being planted as landscaping. Cedar waxwings do sometimes crash into windows, though, and get hit by cars while foraging along roadsides.
