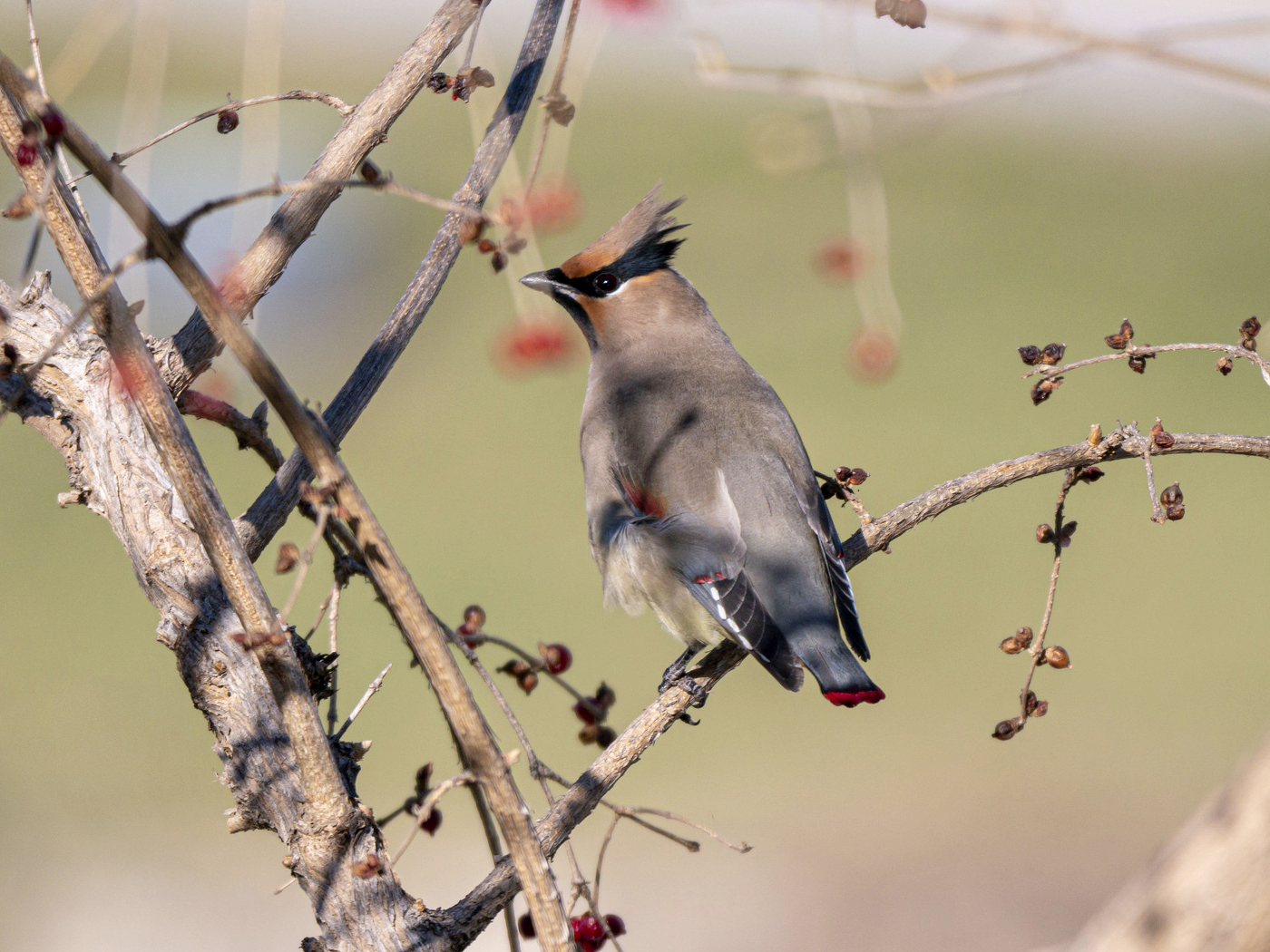

Conservation status
- Near Threatened (IUCN 3.1)

Scientific classification
- Kingdom: Animalia
- Phylum: Chordata
- Class: Aves
- Order: Passeriformes
- Family: Bombycillidae
- Genus: Bombycilla
- Species: B. japonica

Binomial name
- Bombycilla japonica (Siebold, 1824)

= Japanese waxwing =

Species of bird

The Japanese waxwing (Bombycilla japonica) is a fairly small passerine bird in the waxwing family found in the eastern Palaearctic, where it breeds south of the breeding range of the related Bohemian waxwing, but overlaps extensively with it in winter. It feeds mainly on fruit and berries but also eats insects during the summer. The nest is a cup of twigs lined with grass and moss which is built in a tree. In males, the secondary wing feathers have red tips, the resemblance of which to sealing wax gives these birds their common name. It is listed by IUCN as Near Threatened, due to loss and degradation of its preferred forest habitat.

== Taxonomy ==
The Japanese waxwing is one of three species placed in the genus Bombycilla by Louis Pierre Vieillot in 1808. (Note: The apparent discrepancy between Vieillot's book publication date, 1807, and the date of the genus attribution in standard sources, 1808, arises because the book was published in monthly installments over a two-year period between 1807 and 1809.) Bombycilla is Vieillot's attempt at Latin for "silktail", translating the German name Seidenschwänze. Vieillot thought that motacilla, Latin for wagtails, was derived from mota for "move" and cilla, which he thought meant "tail"; however, Motacilla actually combines motacis, a mover, with the diminutive suffix -illa. He then combined this "cilla" with the Latin bombyx, meaning silk. The specific epithet japonica is Latin for "of Japan".

== Description ==
The Japanese waxwing is 15–18 cm in length with a weight of 54–64 g, and its plumage is mostly pinkish-brown. It has a pointed crest, a black throat, a black stripe through the eye, a pale yellow centre to the belly, a grey rump, rusty-red undertail coverts, and a dark grey tail with a black-bordered red tip. The wings have a pattern of black, grey and white with a diffuse reddish-brown bar across the greater covert feathers. Its call is a high-pitched trill but there is no true song.

Unlike Bohemian waxwing, the row of red tips on the secondary feathers of the wing (which give the birds their name) are only present in males; they also lack the 'teardrop' shape of that species. Japanese waxwings often occur in mixed flocks with Bohemian waxwings which, as well as usually having more prominent waxy tips, are slightly larger, and with a yellow tail-tip, greyish centre to the belly and no reddish-brown bar on the wing.

== Distribution and habitat ==
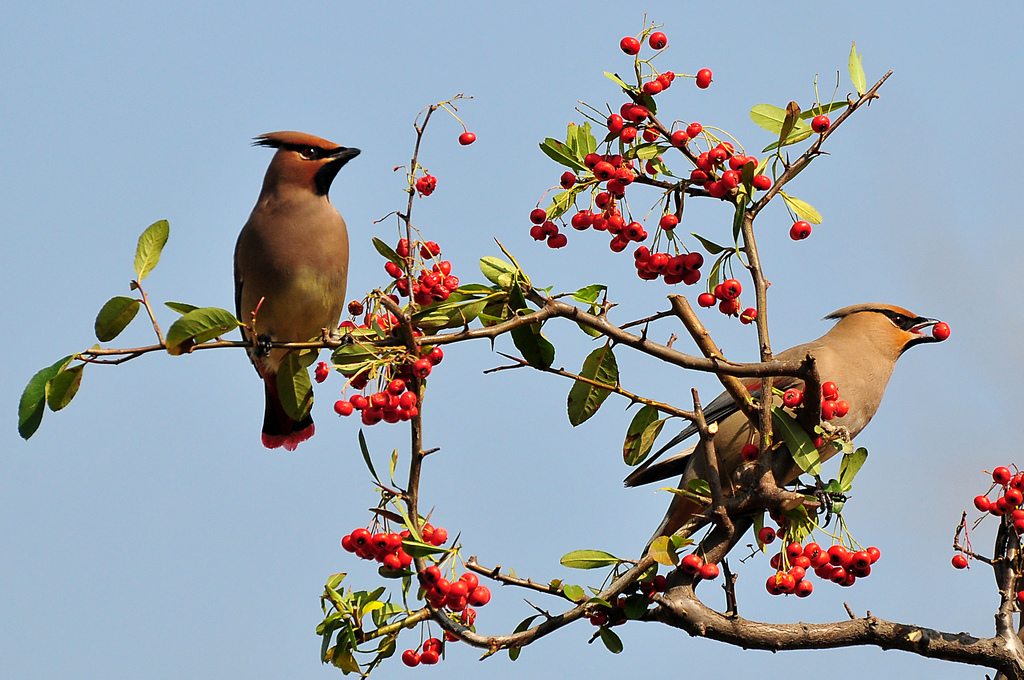
Two Japanese waxwings feeding on berries

The Japanese waxwing breeds in the dense coniferous forest in the Russian Far East (the Amur basin, northern Primorsky Krai, and Sakhalin) and northeasternmost China (Manchuria, Heilongjiang province).

Outside of the breeding season, it migrates south to winter in Japan, the Korean Peninsula, eastern China and Taiwan; the exact distribution is irregular, as birds will travel and move in search of food, mainly seasonal berries, and birds may be common in a certain area during one year but move away the next. In Japan, it is generally present from November to April; few birds winter on Hokkaidō, but in southwestern Japan (Kyūshū, Shikoku, southern Honshu), it outnumbers Bohemian waxwings. In Taiwan, it is an irregular winter visitor, but with large flocks in some winters, such as the 2019-2020 winter when hundreds occurred in March 2020. The winter habitat is open woodland, low-lying farmland, or low mountains, with birds frequently visiting the berry-laden trees in parks and private gardens.

Vagrant birds have been known to appear in Hong Kong and Central China; records from further afield, such as in Europe, South Asia or the Middle East, are more than likely to be escapes from captivity (or aviculture) than genuinely wild birds.
