= Wax jack =

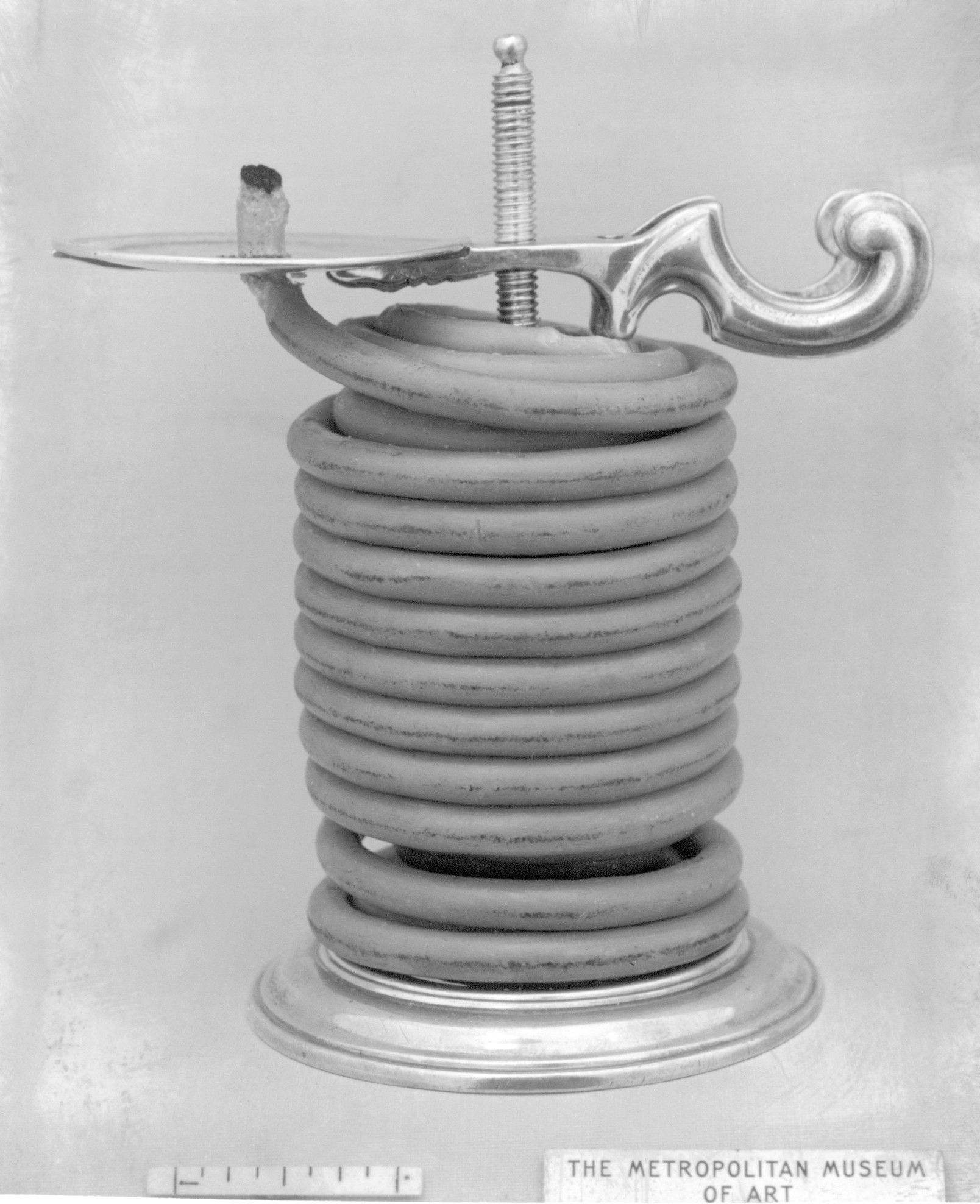
A simple wax jack (Sheffield plate), c. 1740

A wax jack (wax-jack, taper-jack) is a device used to hold a taper of sealing wax intended to create sealings on documents.

The wax jack was first introduced in 1700. Before that time a simple taper was used in a loose ball. Despite the resemblance to a candle, they were not used for illumination. Although common in England and Europe, they were not used much in North America.

Most early wax jacks were worked by silversmiths, although later models also exist in other metals such as iron, brass or bell metal.

== Description ==
A wax jack was a vertical or horizontal shaft around which a thin beeswax taper was coiled. The top end protruded through a hole in a pan that had a pincer to hold the taper in place. This allowed the taper to be lit and the resulting puddle of wax easily controlled. Some models, called "bougie boxes," had a pierced enclosure around the shaft to protect the taper. They were often used when travelling, and to protect the taper from mice. Others included a snuffer.
