= Grigory Polyakov =

Russian and Soviet ornithologist

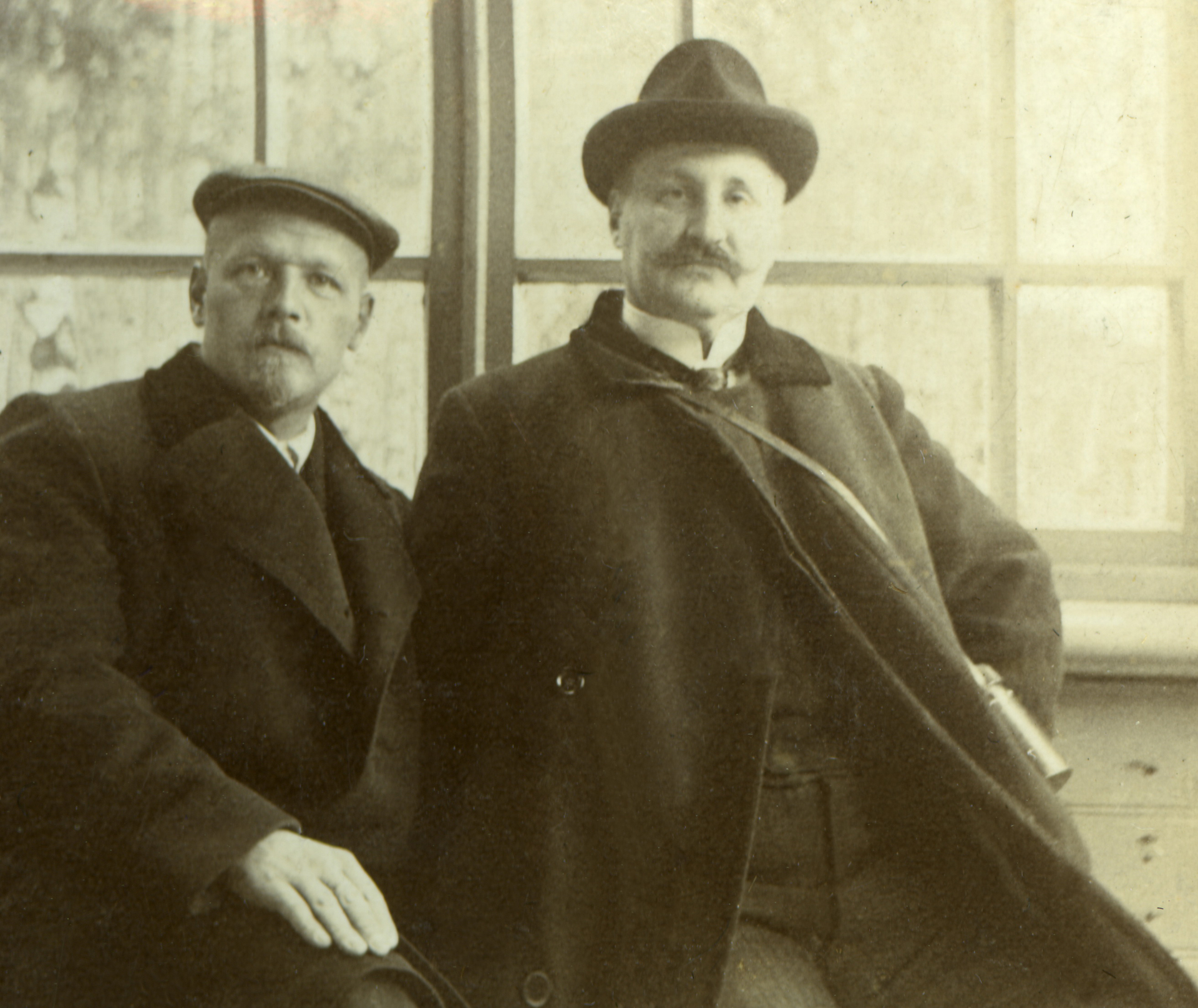
Polyakov (left) and Alexei Morozov around 1913-1914

Grigory Ivanovich Polyakov (Russian: Григорий Иванович Поляков; February 16, 1876 – April 4, 1939) was a Russian and Soviet ornithologist. He founded and published an ornithological bulletin for eight years in which he published extensively. Arrested in 1927 he continued his research in labour camp and was rehabilitated posthumously only in 2003. He was a student of Fyodor Lorenz (1842-1909).

== Biography ==
Polyakov was born in Lyalin Lane, Moscow where his father Ivan Kondratievich Polyakov was a leading businessman and factory owner. He grew up fishing, hunting and observing nature. From around 1900 he began to study the birds of the Moscow region with guidance from Fyodor Lorentz. He attended evening courses in natural history at the Shanyavsky Moscow City People's University. His first notes on birds were published in 1910. He was also involved in organizing a hunting organization and in 1916 he was appointed in the department of fishing and hunting. A second work on the birds of Bogorodsk was published in 1924. From 1910 to 1917 he organized the first ornithological bulletin in Russian, just after the death of Lorenz, whose obituary was published in the first issue by A.F. Kohts. He received a gold medal from the Imperial Society for the Acclimatization of Animals and Plants for his work in organizing the publication. It was however subscribed by only about a 100 and subsidies from the department of agriculture were in trouble with changing political situation around 1916. Polyakov also became ill and sought the help of M.A. Menzbier. Following the 1917 revolution, Polyakov continued his bird studies and donated a number of bird specimens to the Zoological Museum. He made a trip to Kursk in 1925 and on June 22 1927 he was arrested as a bourgeois element and alleged counter-revolutionary and was sentenced to 10 years in labour camp. While at the Solovki prison camp he continued to study birds and was made in charge of the biological station from 1927 to 1931 where he found a gull in the Solovetsky Monastery that Sushkin identified for him as a form of herring gull. In 1929 his term was reduced to five years. In 1932 Polyakov was in Vologda and given a research position still in communication with ornithologists like S.A. Buturlin. In 1933-34 he was in Moscow and his health declined and several colleagues attempted to help him obtain a pension. Little is known of his last days but he died of tuberculosis. He was officially rehabilitated on 15 May 2003.
