= Sealing wax =

Material used to seal documents

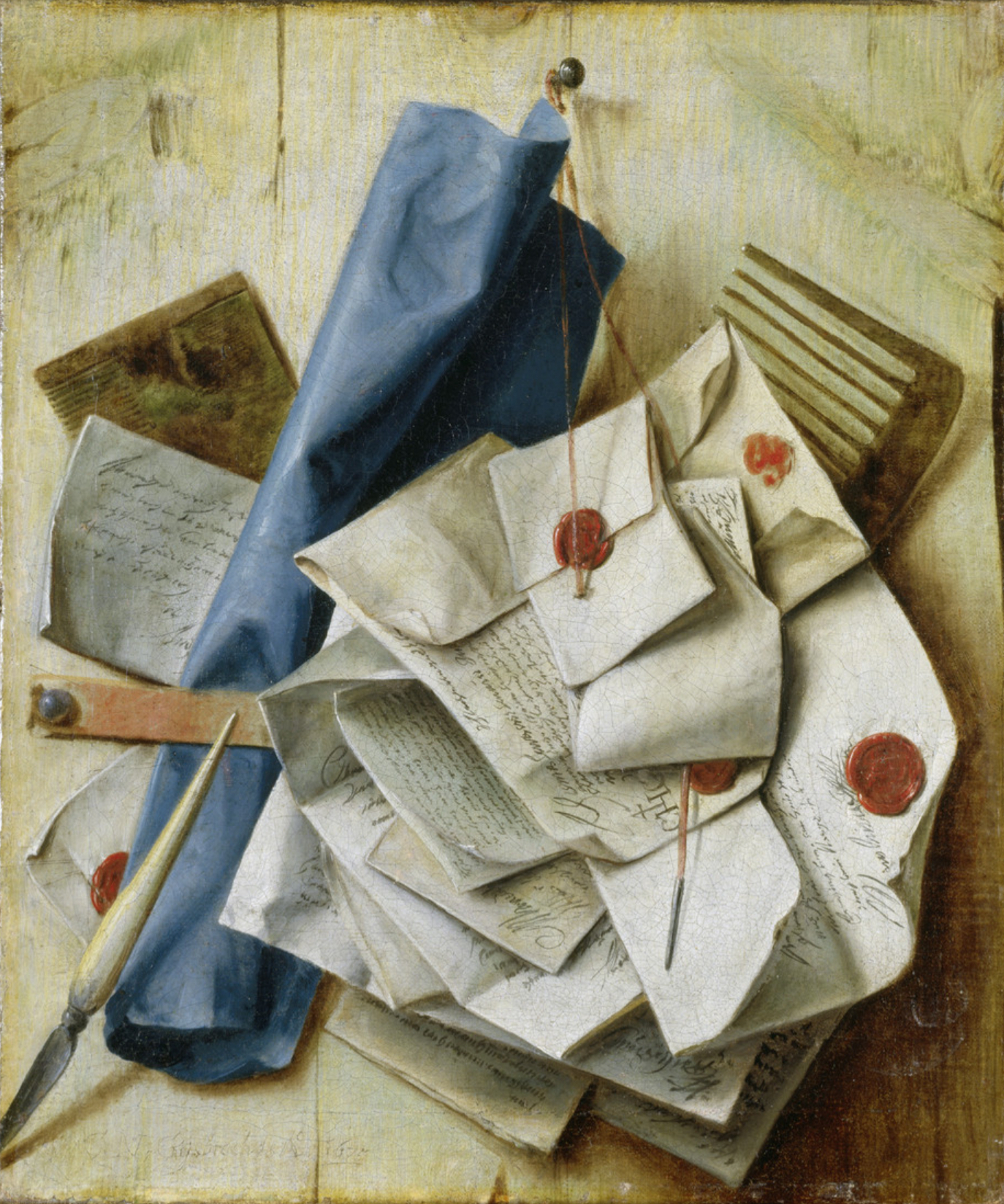
Letters sealed with wax in a painting from 1675 by Cornelis Norbertus Gysbrechts

Sealing wax is a wax material which, after melting, hardens quickly (to paper, parchment, ribbons and wire, and other material), forming a seal that is difficult to break without noticeable tampering. Wax is used to verify that something such as a document is unopened, to verify the sender's identity (for example with a seal stamp or signet ring), and as decoration. Sealing wax can also be used to take impressions of other seals. Wax was used to seal letters close and later, from about the 16th century, envelopes. Long before sealing wax was employed, the Romans used bitumen for this purpose.

== Composition ==
A donor portrait by Petrus Christus, c. 1455, showing a print attached to the wall with sealing wax

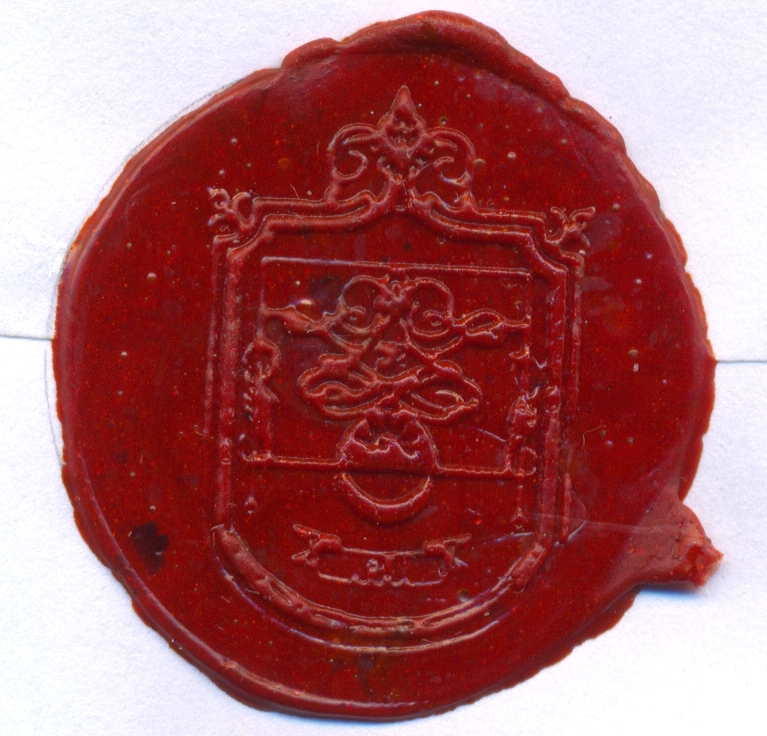
Wax seal displaying the Fonseca Padilla family arms

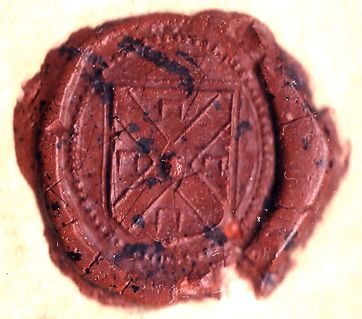
Personal seal of William Stoughton (judge) with his coat of arms, as it appears on the warrant for the execution of Bridget Bishop for witchcraft in Salem, Massachusetts, in 1692

Formulas vary, but there was a major shift after European trade with the Indies opened. In the Middle Ages, sealing wax was typically made of beeswax and "Venice turpentine", a greenish-yellow resinous extract of the European larch tree. The earliest wax of this kind was uncoloured. Later the wax was coloured red with vermilion. From the 16th century it was compounded of various proportions of shellac, turpentine, resin, chalk or plaster, and colouring matter (often vermilion, or red lead), but not necessarily beeswax. The proportion of chalk varied; coarser grades are used to seal wine bottles and fruit preserves, finer grades for documents. In some situations, such as putting large seals on public documents, beeswax was used. On occasion, sealing wax has historically been perfumed by ambergris, musk and other scents.

By 1866, many different colours were available: gold (using mica), blue (using smalt or verditer), black (using verdigris or lamp black), white (using bismuth nitrate or lead white), yellow (using the mercuric mineral turpeth, also known as Schuetteite), green (using verdigris) and so on. Some users, such as the British Crown, assign different colours to different types of documents. Today a range of synthetic colours is available.

== Method of application ==
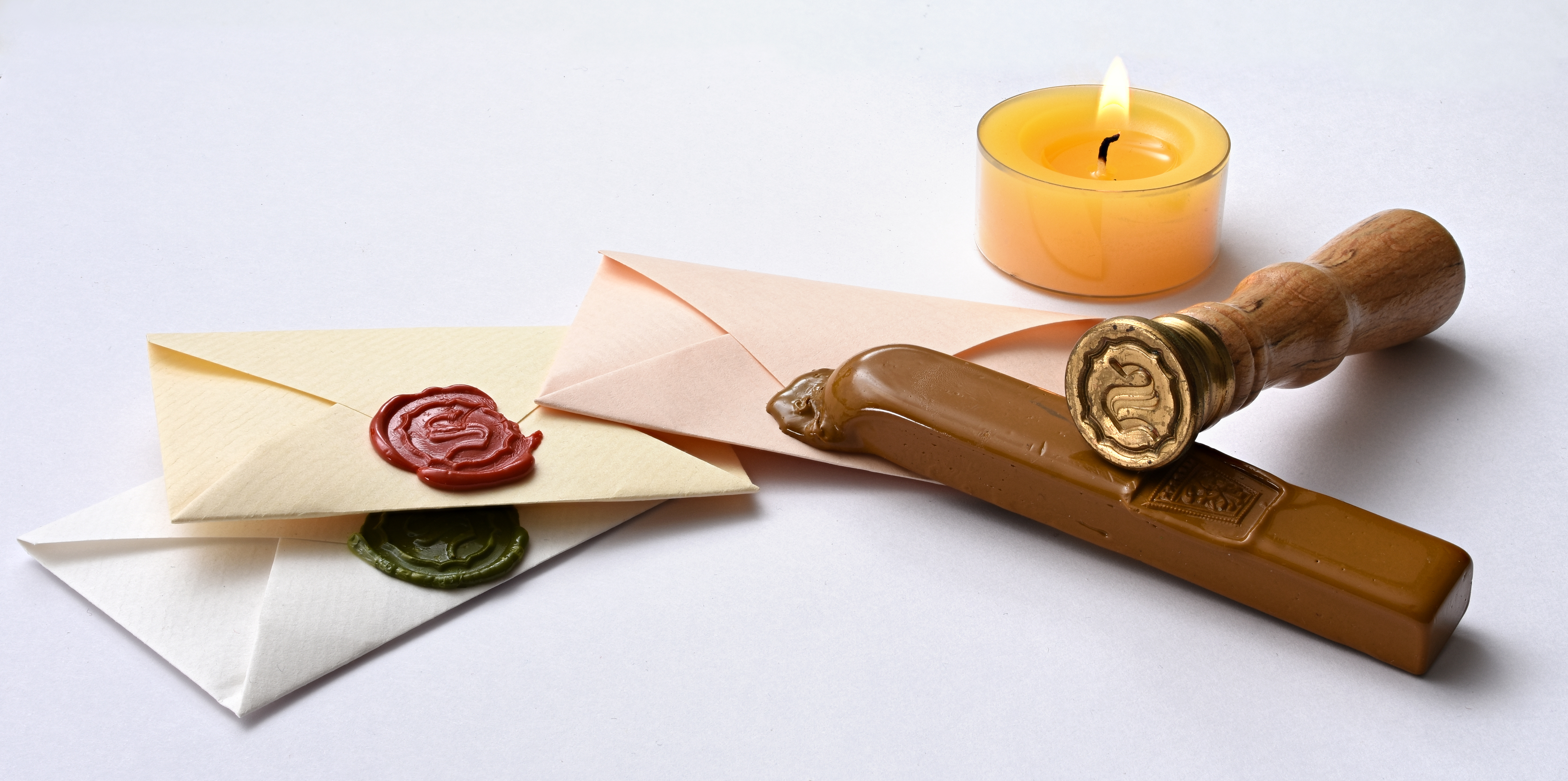
Sealed letters and means of application

Sealing wax is available in the form of sticks, sometimes with a wick, or as granules. The stick is melted at one end (but not ignited or blackened), or the granules heated in a spoon, normally using a flame, and then placed where required, usually on the flap of an envelope. While the wax is still soft and warm, the seal (preferably at the same temperature as the wax, for the best impression) should be quickly and firmly pressed into it and released.

== Modern use ==
At the end of 19th century and in the first half of the 20th century, sealing wax was used in laboratories as a vacuum cement. It was gradually replaced by other materials, like plasticine, but according to Nobel Laureate Patrick Blackett, "at one time it might have been hard to find in an English laboratory an apparatus which did not use red Bank of England sealing-wax as a vacuum cement."

Since the advent of a postal system, the use of sealing wax has become more for ceremony than security. Modern times have required new styles of wax, allowing for mailing of the seal without damage or removal. These new waxes are flexible for mailing and are referred to as glue-gun sealing wax, faux sealing wax and flexible sealing wax. Traditional sealing wax candles are produced in Canada, Spain, Mexico, France, Italy and Scotland, with formulations similar to those used historically.

== See also ==
- Bulla (seal)
- Papal bull
- Tamper-evident
- Letterlocking
- Wax jack
