= List of birds of Washington =

List of birds of Washington may refer to:

- List of birds of Washington (state)
- List of birds of Washington, D.C.
