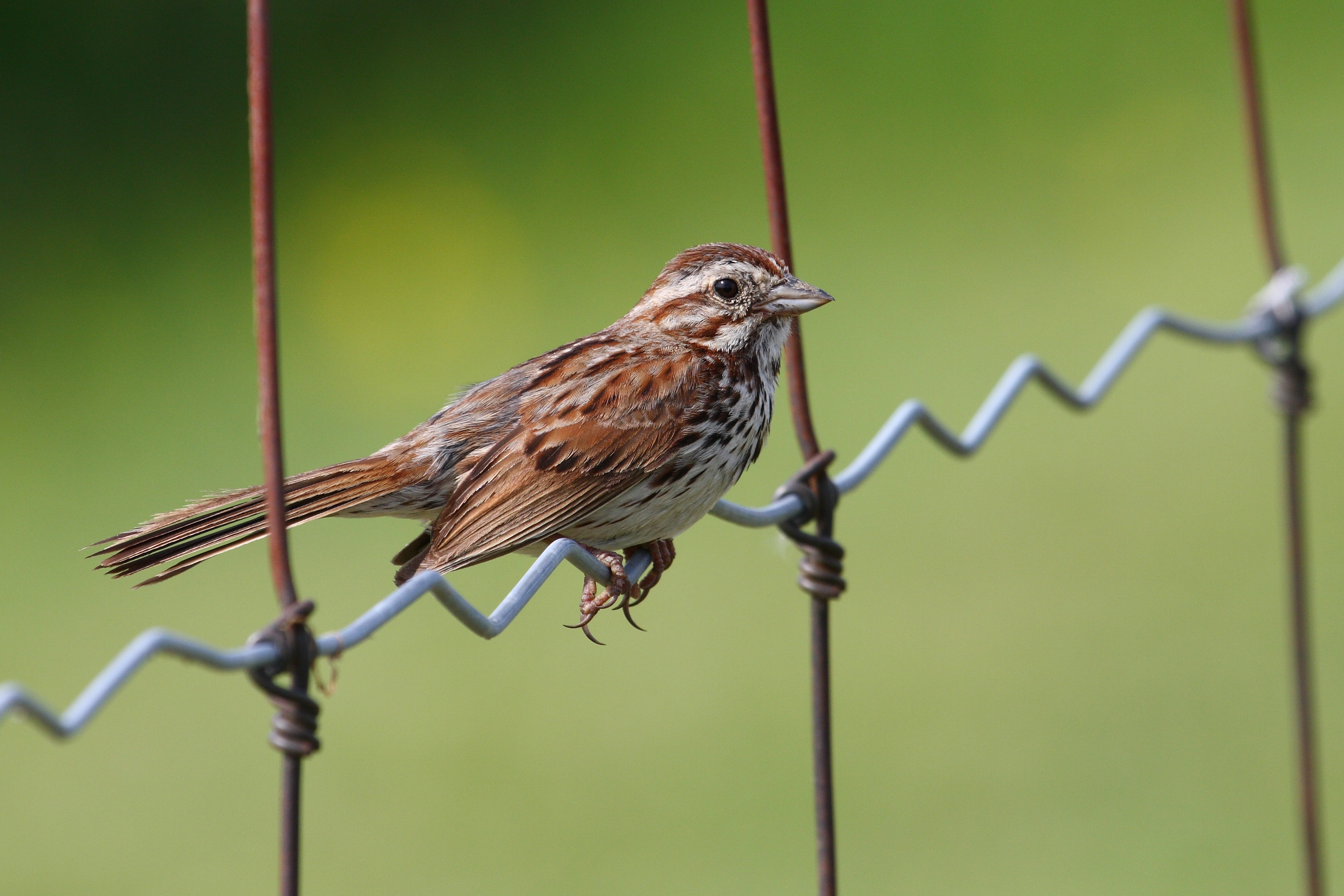
- Song sparrow (Melospiza melodia)
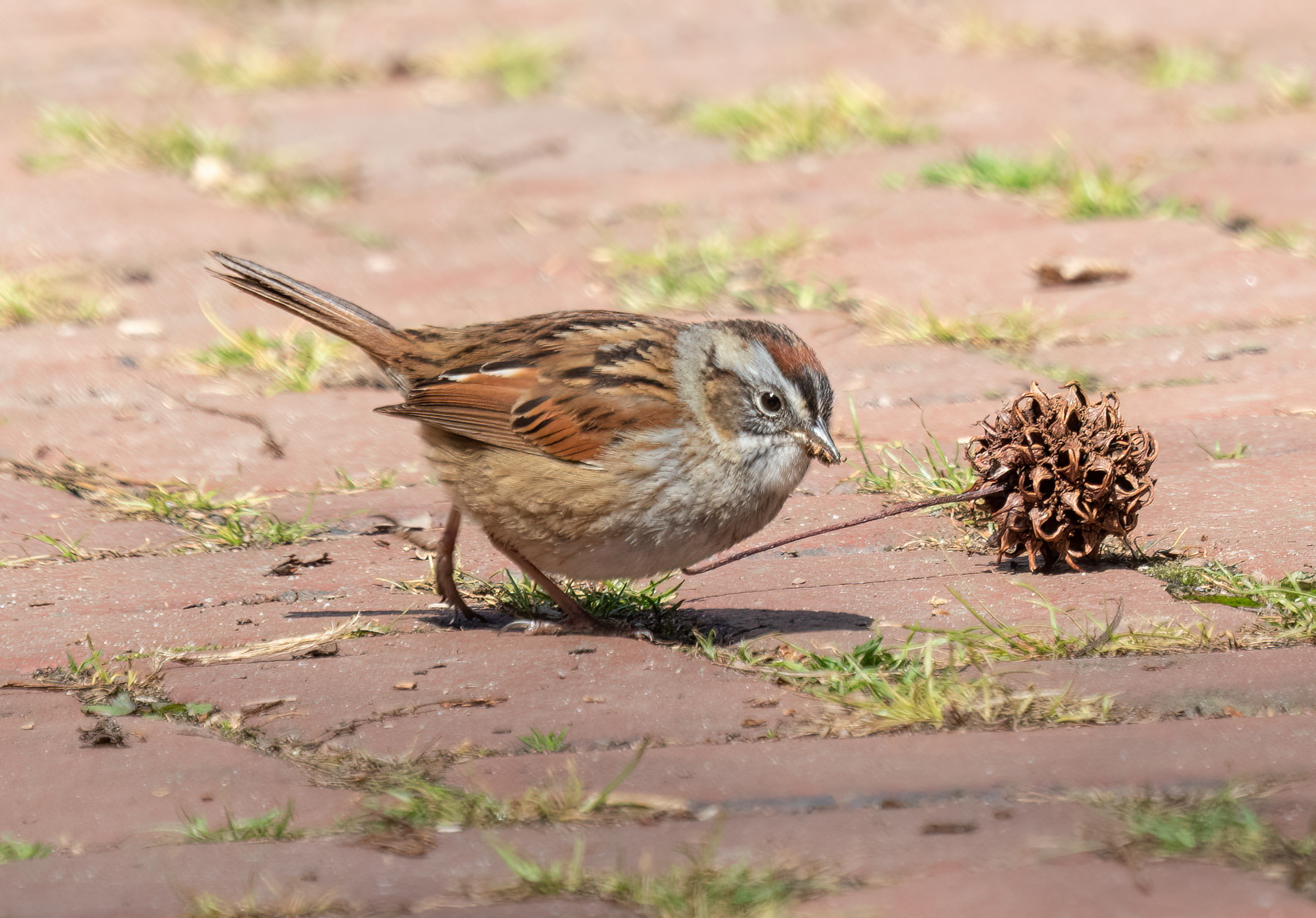
- Swamp sparrow (Melospiza georgiana)

Scientific classification
- Kingdom: Animalia
- Phylum: Chordata
- Class: Aves
- Order: Passeriformes
- Family: Passerellidae
- Genus: Melospiza; Baird, 1858

Type species
- Fringilla melodia A. Wilson, 1810

Species
- See text

= Melospiza =

Genus of birds

Melospiza is a genus of passerine birds formerly placed in the family Emberizidae, but now placed in Passerellidae. The genus, commonly referred to as "song sparrows," currently contains three species, all of which are native to North America.

Members of Melospiza are medium-sized sparrows with long tails, which are pumped in flight and held moderately high on perching. They are not seen in flocks, but as a few individuals or solitary. They prefer brushy habitats, often near water.

== Species of Melospiza ==
Genus Melospiza – Baird, 1858 – three species
Common name	Scientific name and subspecies	Range	Size and ecology	IUCN status and estimated population
Lincoln's sparrow	Melospiza lincolnii (Audubon, 1834) Three subspecies: M. l. lincolnii; M. l. gracilis; M. l. alticola	Canada, Alaska, and the northeastern and western United States	Size: Habitat: Diet:	LC
Song sparrow	Melospiza melodia (Wilson, 1810)	Canada and the United States.	Size: Habitat: Diet:	LC
Swamp sparrow	Melospiza georgiana (Latham, 1790)	eastern North America and central Canada	Size: Habitat: Diet:	LC

== See also ==
- American sparrows
