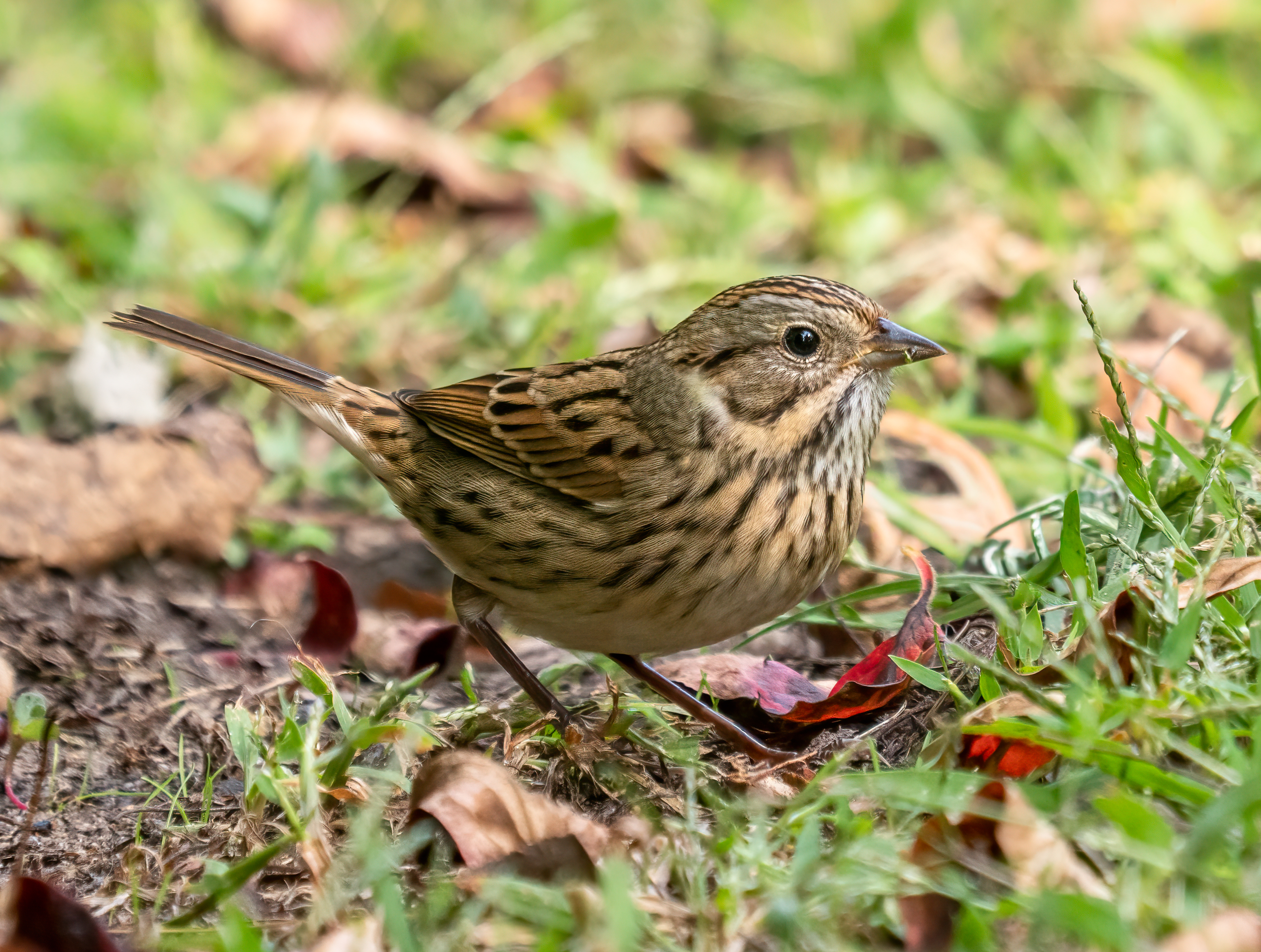

Conservation status
- Least Concern (IUCN 3.1)

Scientific classification
- Kingdom: Animalia
- Phylum: Chordata
- Class: Aves
- Order: Passeriformes
- Family: Passerellidae
- Genus: Melospiza
- Species: M. lincolnii

Binomial name
- Melospiza lincolnii (Audubon, 1834)
- Distribution Breeding Migration Year-round Nonbreeding

Audio

= Lincoln's sparrow =

Species of bird

Lincoln's sparrow (Melospiza lincolnii) is a small sparrow native to North America. It is a less common passerine bird that often stays hidden under thick ground cover, but can be distinguished by its sweet, wrenlike song. Lincoln's sparrow is one of three species in the genus Melospiza which also includes the song sparrow (M. melodia) and the swamp sparrow (M. georgiana). It lives in well-covered brushy habitats, often near water. This bird is poorly documented because of its secretive nature and breeding habits solely in boreal regions.

== Description ==
Adults have dark-streaked olive-brown upperparts and a light brown breast with fine streaks, a white belly, and a white throat. They have a brown cap with a grey stripe in the middle, olive-brown wings, and a narrow tail. Their face is grey with brown cheeks, a buffy mustache, and a brown line through the eye with a narrow eye ring. Males and females are alike in plumage. They are somewhat similar in appearance to the song sparrow although smaller and trimmer with finer breast streaks.

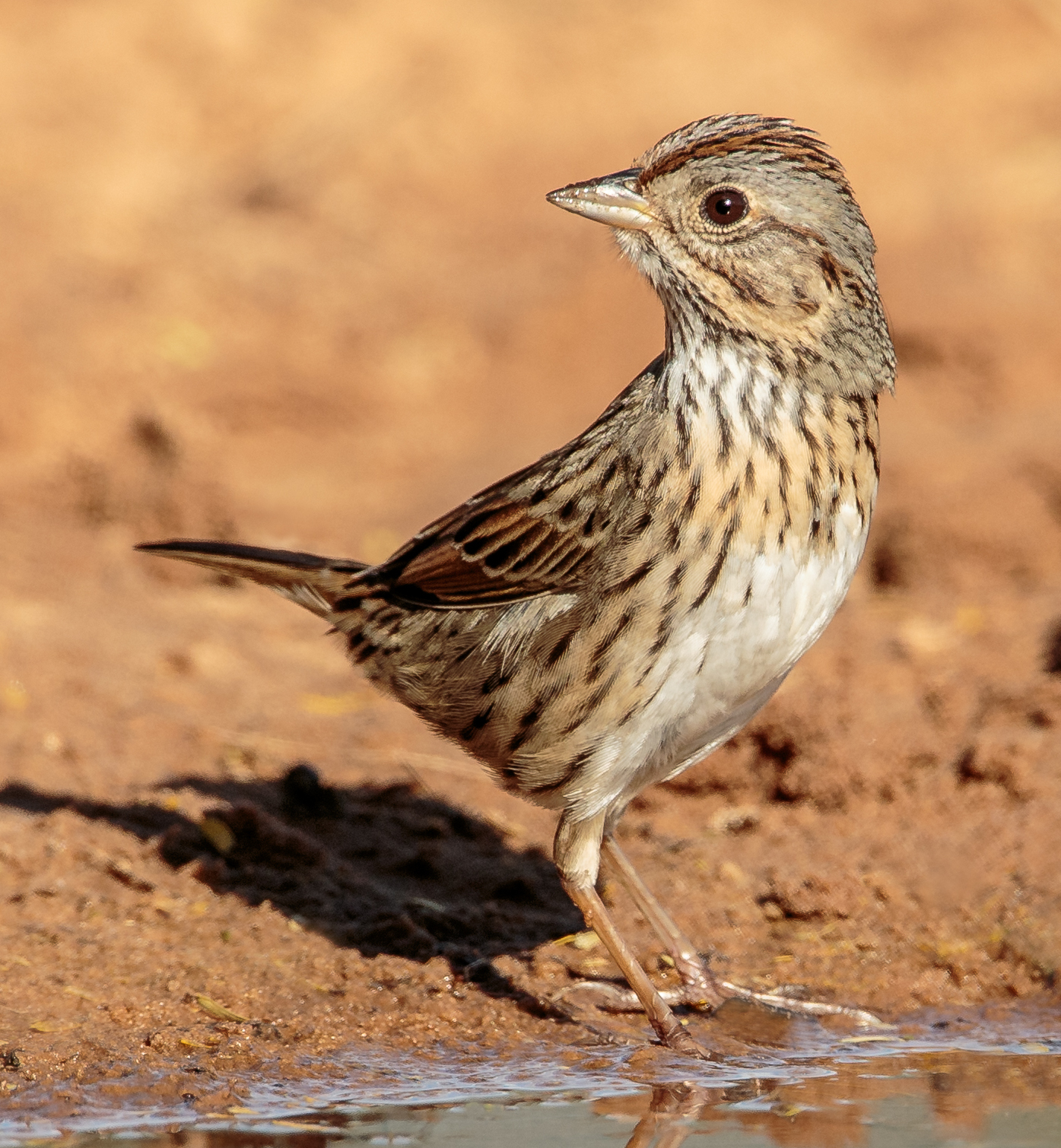
M. lincolnii in Texas

Juveniles strongly resemble juvenile swamp sparrows with a streaky chest and not yet buffy breast, but Lincoln's sparrows rarely have a unicolored crown like the swamp sparrow.

Adult measurements:

- Length: 5.1–5.9 in (13–15 cm)
- Weight: 0.6–0.7 oz (17–19 g)
- Wingspan: 7.5–8.7 in (19–22 cm)

== Taxonomy ==
Lincoln's sparrow was named by John James Audubon after his friend Thomas Lincoln of Dennysville, Maine. Lincoln shot the bird on an expedition with Audubon to Nova Scotia in 1834, and Audubon named it in honor of his travel companion.

=== Subspecies ===
There are three known subspecies of Lincoln's sparrow. However, some authors suggest that M. l. lincolnii and M. l. alticola should be considered one subspecies because of their morphological similarity.

- Melospiza lincolnii lincolnii is generally larger with more ruddy brown or gray-brown coloring and less yellow edging on dorsal feathers.
- Melospiza lincolnii gracilis is smaller with more yellow on dorsal feathers and broader dark shaft streaks creating greater contrasts in dorsal coloration. Its breeding habitat extends from the southern Alaskan archipelago to central British Columbia.
- Melospiza lincolnii alticola, the montane Lincoln's sparrow, is the largest subspecies and most uniform in color with a mostly brown back and narrow shaft streaks on dorsal feathers. It lives in the central Rocky Mountains of Canada and the mountains of California and Oregon and breeds as far south as New Mexico and Arizona.

== Habitat and distribution ==
Its breeding habitat is subalpine and montane zones across Canada, Alaska, and the northeastern and western United States, although they are less common in the eastern parts of their range. They are found mainly in wet thickets, shrubby bogs, and moss-dominated habitats. They prefer to be near dense shrub cover and their nests are well-concealed shallow open cups on the ground under vegetation. At lower elevations, they can also be found in mixed deciduous groves, mixed shrub-willows, and black spruce-tamarack bogs. They primarily use the ground and base of willows for foraging, whereas they use tall trees and willow branches for singing.

During migration, it lives in thickets and bushes, particularly in riparian zones. They use lowlands such as the Great Plains and Great Basin, as well as urban and suburban habitats in the east. Their migration period starts between May 13 to 30 and lasts until August 20 to September 20. Their southern habitats over the winter include tropical evergreen and deciduous forests, arid and humid pine-oak forests, Pacific swamp forests, and arid subtropical scrub.

Its wintering range extends from the southern United States down to Mexico and northern Central America; they are passage migrants over much of the United States, except in the west. In 2010, a Lincoln's sparrow was observed for the first time in the Dominican Republic, and there have also been several records of this species in montane regions of Haiti. However, the skulking behavior of this bird and their preference for densely-covered habitats makes it difficult to accurately describe the full range of this species.

== Behaviour ==
=== Vocalizations ===
Lincoln's sparrow is a very secretive species; they are often not seen or heard even where they are common. Only the males are known to sing and their song is unique among the Melospiza genus. They produce a sweet, wrenlike, gurgling song with varied frequencies. First, there are often several rapid, high-pitched introductory notes, which then go into a trill that starts out low, rises abruptly, and then drops. Similar to the swamp sparrow, Lincoln's sparrow has a relatively small song repertoire with an average of 3.7 different song types per individual. However, their complex, multisyllabic song pattern is comparable to that of a song sparrow, whereas the swamp sparrow has a simple, single-syllabic song. They sing most frequently in the morning and only in the beginning of the breeding season before incubation. They often sing while exposed on perches, as well as during flight.

This bird has two calls sounds: one is an aggressive, flat tup or chip while the other is a soft, high-pitched buzzy zeet. The latter in males is often followed by their song. The zeet call is generally used while under dense cover, whereas the chip call is used while exposed on perches to attract attention or during antagonistic encounters. Both calls are used in nest defense. They also have a distinct, hoarse, buzzing zrrr-zrrr-zrrr call sequence used for mating, during territorial disputes, and when mate-guarding.

=== Diet ===
In the winter, the majority of their diet consists of small seeds of weeds and grasses, but when available they will also eat terrestrial vertebrates. During the breeding season, they mainly feed on arthropods including insect larvae, ants, spiders, beetles, flies, moths, caterpillars, mayflies, and others. Adults typically eat prey from higher trophic levels such as spiders, whereas they feed their chicks greater proportions of plant material and lower trophic level prey like grasshoppers. They mostly forage on the ground in dense vegetation and, in the winter, may occasionally use bird feeders. They catch prey with their bill while hopping on the ground and typically swallow their prey whole.

=== Reproduction ===
Males arrive to the breeding ground in mid to late May and begin to sing in order to attract a mate. In early June, females build their nests on the ground under dense grass or shrub cover, usually inside a low willow shrub, mountain birch, or sunken in a depression of sphagnum moss. Their nest is a well-covered shallow open cup of grasses or sedges. Clutch size is typically 3–5 eggs which are oval in shape and colored pale green to greenish-white and spotted reddish brown. One egg is laid per day, and females begin incubating eggs before the clutch is complete, while males do not incubate. Incubation lasts for about 12–14 days. Young are born altricial and leave the nest about 9–12 days after hatching, although they may be cared for by their parents for another 2–3 weeks. Fledglings are mostly flightless their first day, but their flying abilities quickly improve, and by day six they can fly more than 10 meters at a time.

In Lincoln's sparrows, male bill shape is correlated with the quality of their songs, with declining quality as the ratio of bill height to bill width decreases. This impacts reproductive success because song quality influences female mating preferences. Males that hatch later in the breeding season tend to have bill shapes that are less suitable for producing songs that attract females, and thus, have lower reproductive success.
