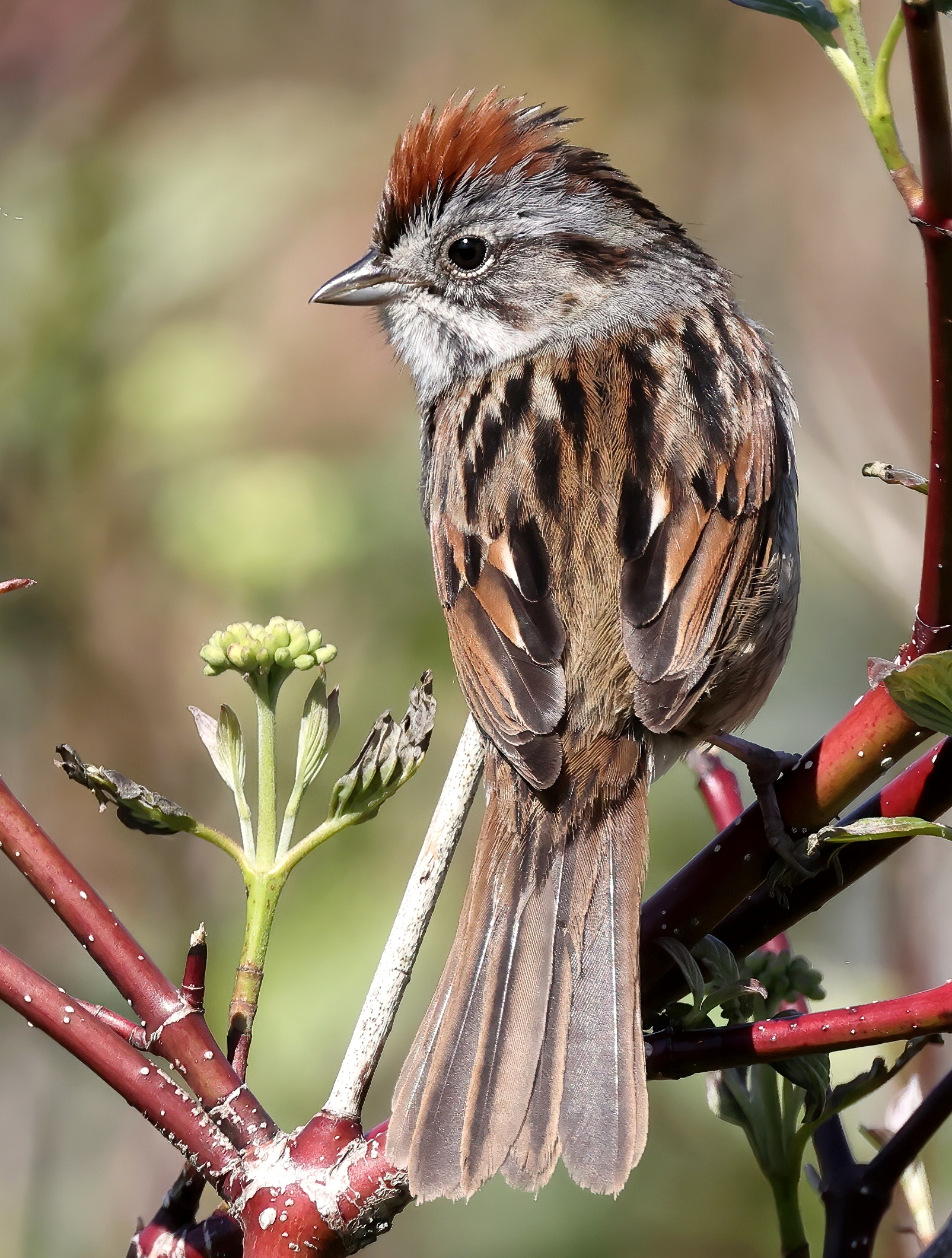
- In Quebec, Canada

Conservation status
- Least Concern (IUCN 3.1)

Scientific classification
- Kingdom: Animalia
- Phylum: Chordata
- Class: Aves
- Order: Passeriformes
- Family: Passerellidae
- Genus: Melospiza
- Species: M. georgiana

Binomial name
- Melospiza georgiana (Latham, 1790)
- Distribution map Breeding Migration Resident Non-breeding

= Swamp sparrow =

Species of bird

The swamp sparrow (Melospiza georgiana) is a medium-sized New World sparrow related to the song sparrow.

== Description ==
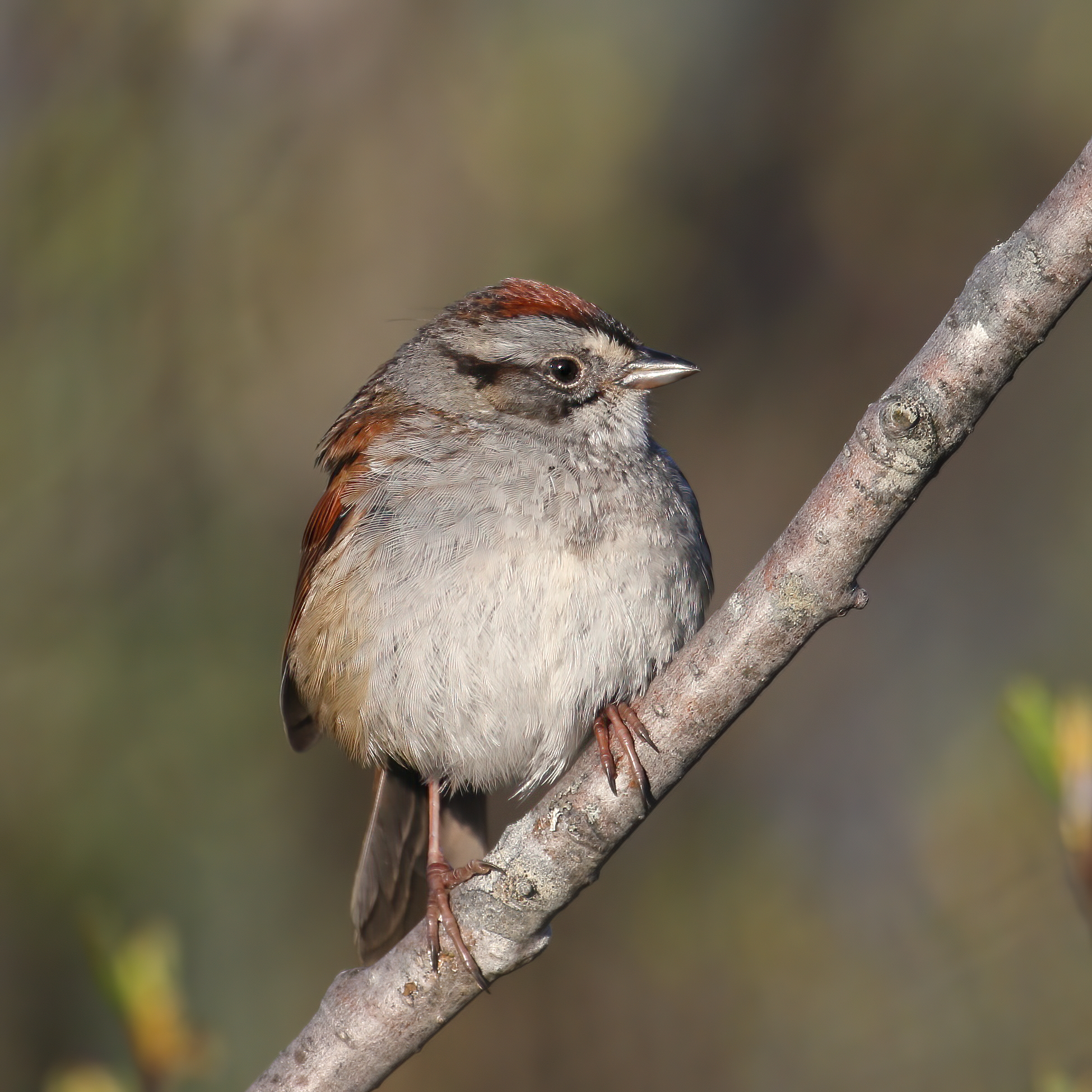
In Quebec, Canada

Measurements:

- Length: 4.7–5.9 in (12–15 cm)
- Weight: 0.5–0.8 oz (15–23 g)
- Wingspan: 7.1–7.5 in (18–19 cm)

Adults have streaked rusty, buff and black upperparts with an unstreaked gray breast, light belly and a white throat. The wings are strikingly rusty. Most males and a few females have rust-colored caps. Their face is gray with a dark line through the eye. They have a short bill and fairly long legs. Immature birds and winter adults usually have two brown crown stripes and much of the gray is replaced with buff.

== Distribution and habitat ==
Swamp sparrows breed across the northern United States and boreal Canada. The southern edge of their breeding range coincides largely with the Line of Maximum Glaciation. A small number of morphologically distinct birds inhabit tidal marshes from northern Virginia to the Hudson River Estuary. This subspecies (M. g. nigrescens) winters in coastal marshes of the Carolinas and differs from the two inland swamp sparrow subspecies in having more black in a grayer overall plumage, larger bill, different songs, and a smaller average clutch size.

Their breeding habitat is marshes, including brackish marshes, across eastern North America and central Canada. The bulky nest is attached to marsh vegetation, often just above the ground or surface of the water with leaves or grass arching over the top. The female builds a new nest each year and lays an average of four eggs per clutch. Females give a series of chips as they leave the nest, probably to ward off attacks by their mate or neighboring males.

While swamp sparrows can be found year-round in small numbers on the southern edge of their breeding range, individuals are probably all migratory, primarily migrating to the southeastern United States.

== Diet ==
Swamp sparrows generally forage on the ground near the water's edge, in shallow water or in marsh vegetation. In winter, their diet is principally fruit and seeds, while during the breeding season their diet is mainly arthropods.

== Call ==
The song of the swamp sparrow is a monotone trill, slower than that of the chipping sparrow. A male can have a repertoire of several different trills. The common call note is a loud chip reminiscent of a phoebe.

Song
Singing from the edge of a marsh in Minnesota

== Status ==
The species has a large and stable population size. Over the past decades there have been moderate range expansions, especially in its breeding range. It is however susceptible to habitat loss, particularly in coastal salt marshes. In its southern range and in coastal habitats their numbers have locally declined, in part due to habitat loss.

== Gallery ==
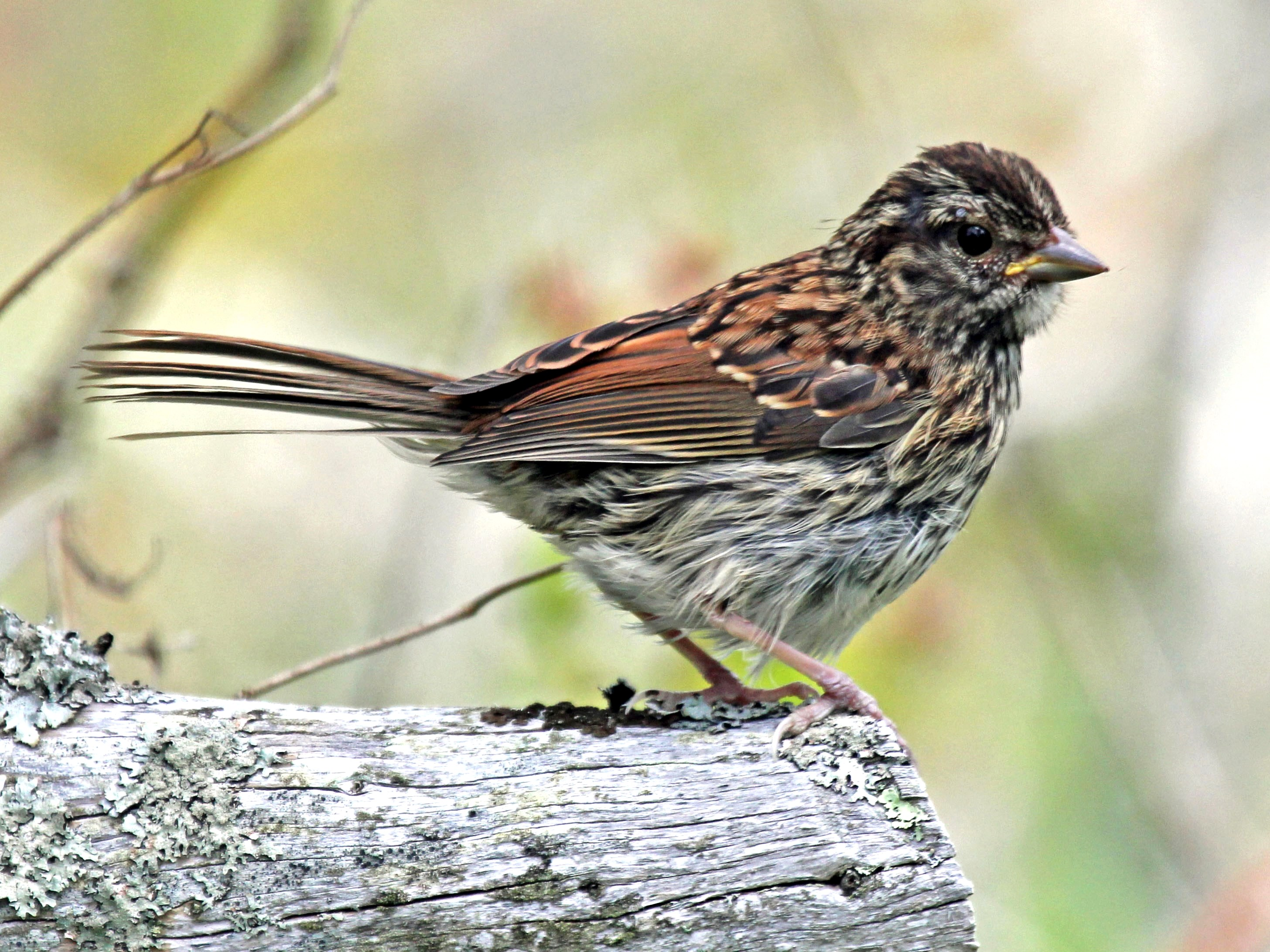
Juvenile bird in August in Maine

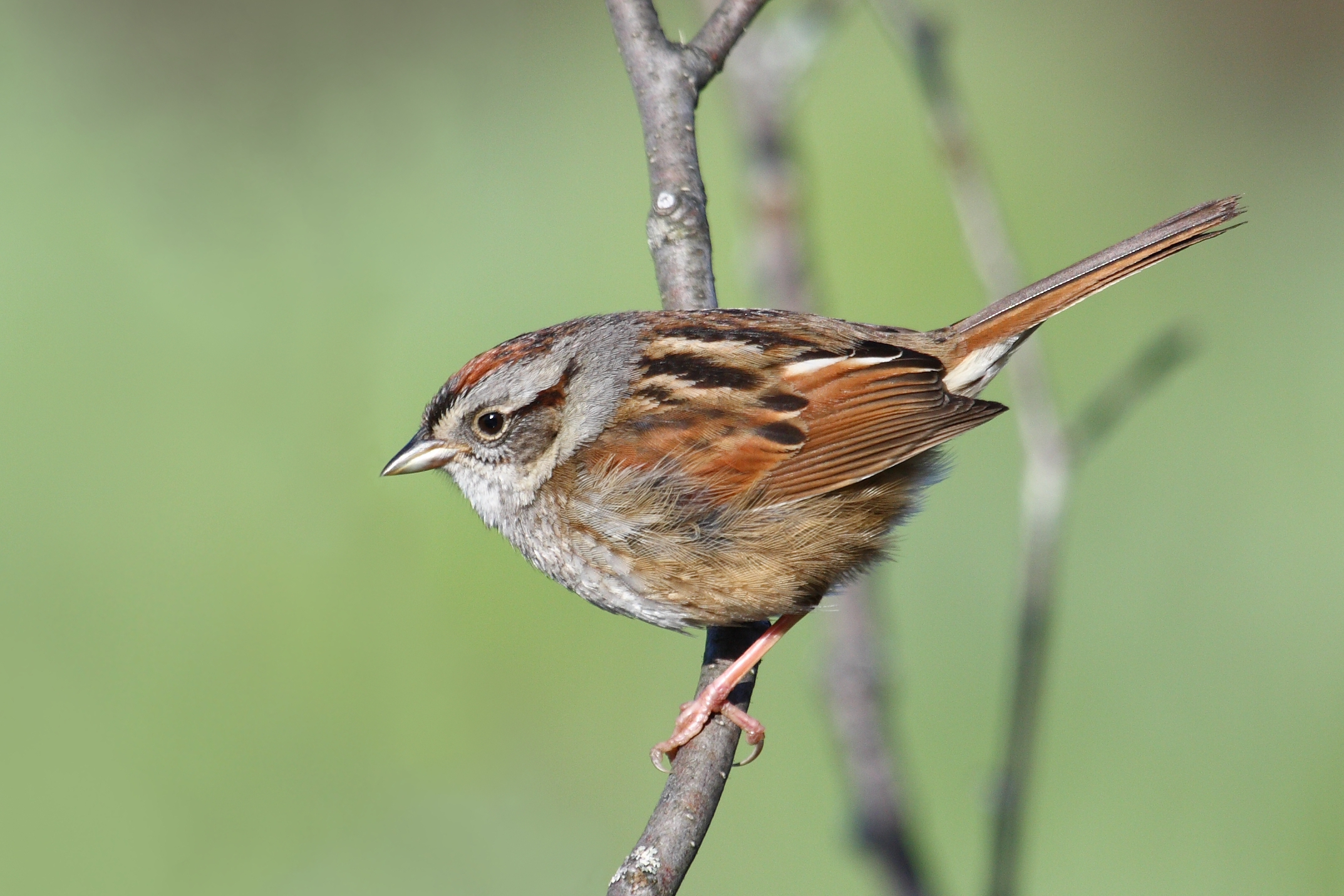
In Quebec, Canada

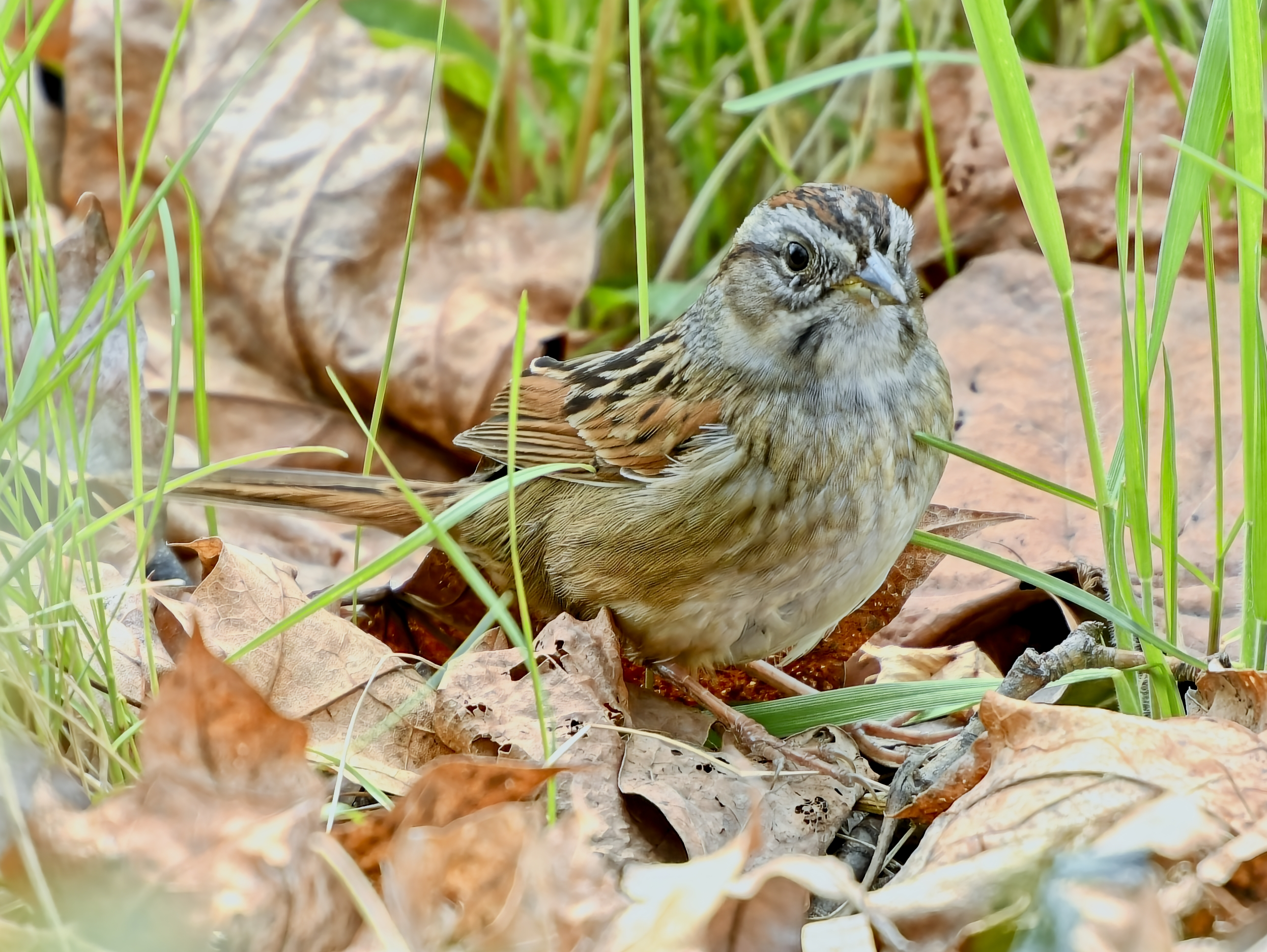
In Toronto, Ontario

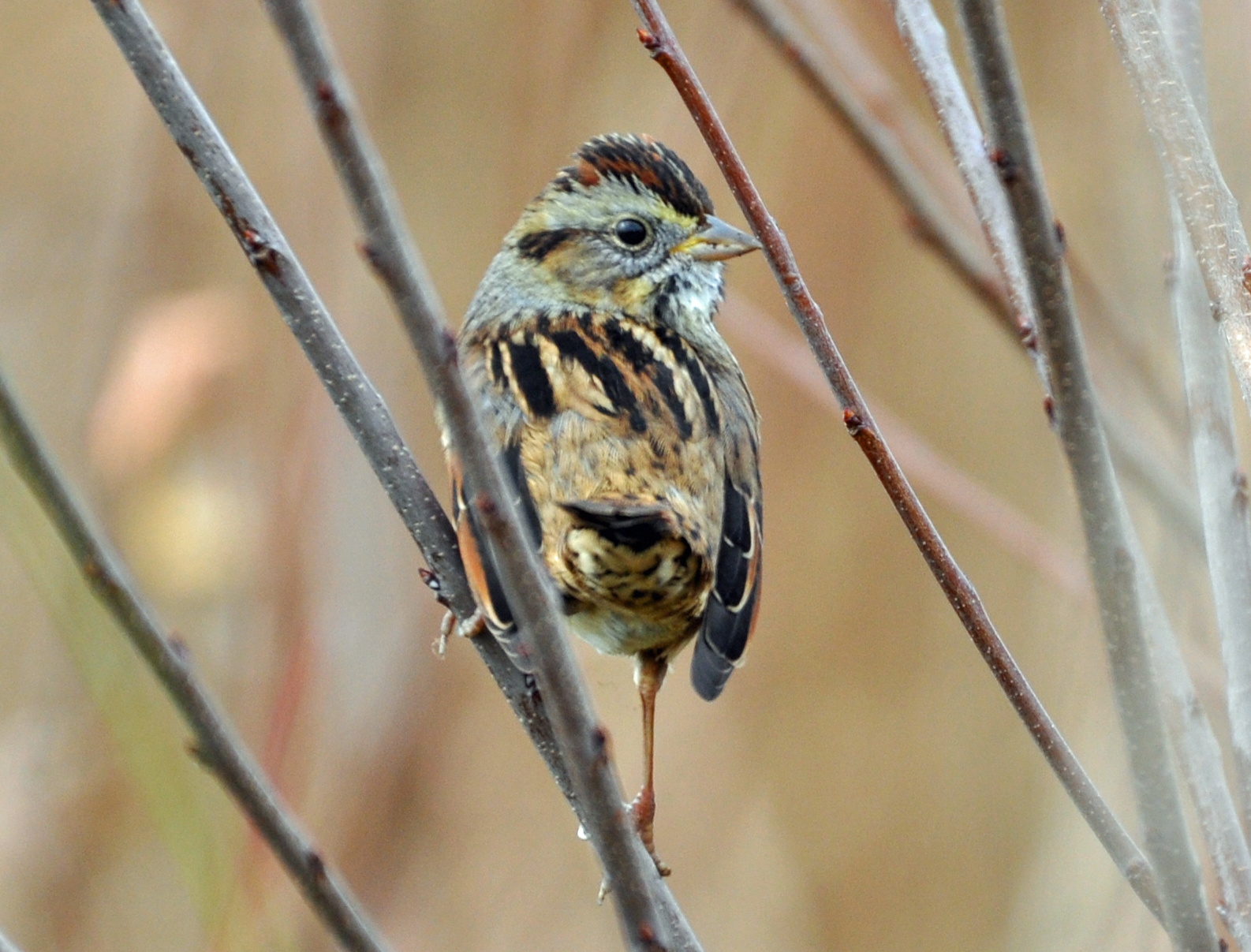
At Lake Mattamuskeet in North Carolina
