= List of birds of Yellowstone National Park =

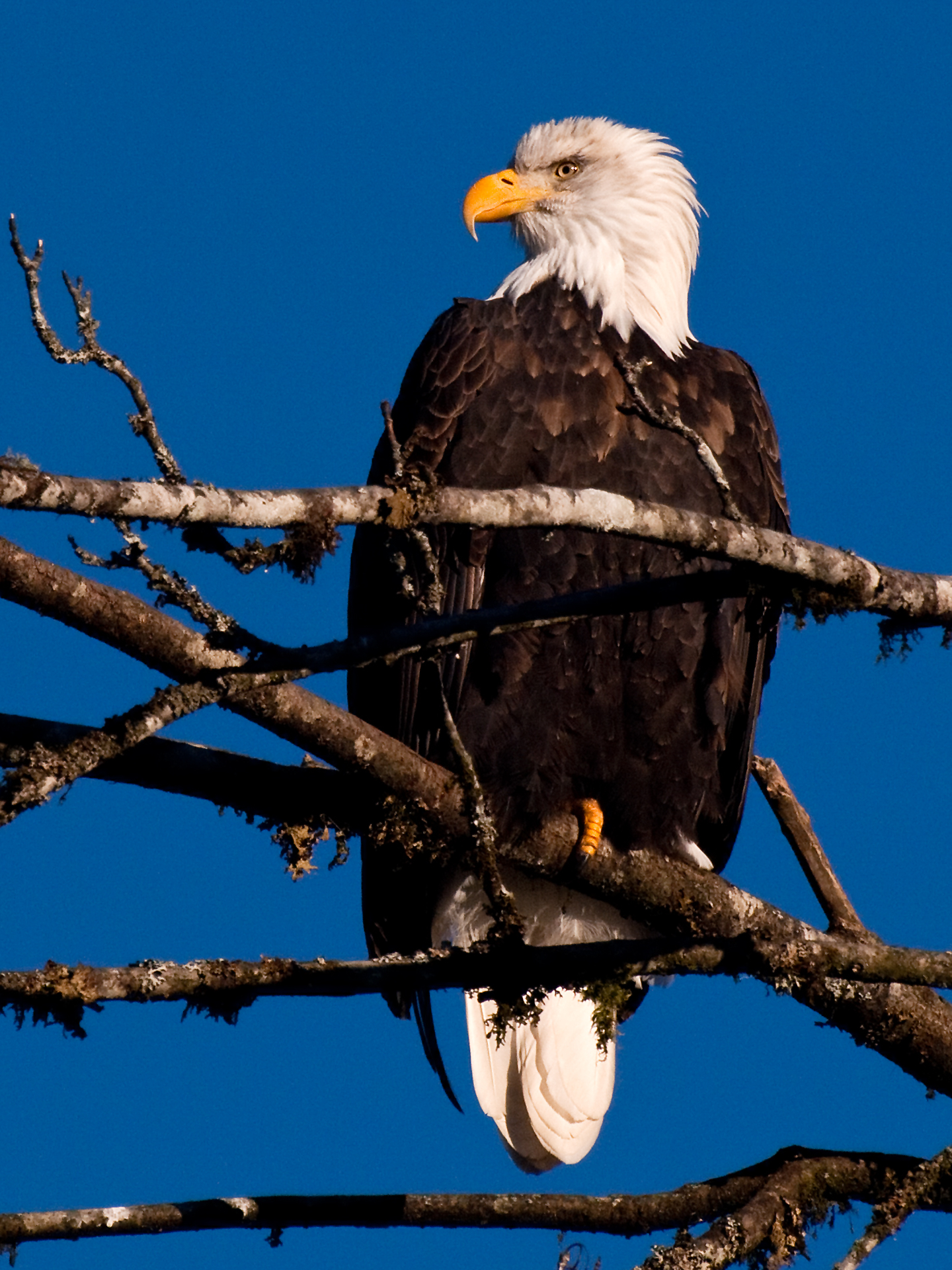
Bald eagle

This is a comprehensive listing of the bird species recorded in Yellowstone National Park, which is mostly in the U.S. state of Wyoming and also extends into Idaho and Montana. This list is based on one published by the National Park Service (NPS) dated June 2021 that contains 284 species when taxonomic changes have been made.

This list is presented in the taxonomic sequence of the Check-list of North and Middle American Birds, 7th edition through the 66th Supplement, published by the American Ornithological Society (AOS). Common and scientific names are also those of the Check-list, except that the common names of families are from the Clements taxonomy because the AOS list does not include them.

Unless otherwise noted, all the species on this list are considered to occur regularly in the park as permanent residents, summer or winter visitors, or migrants. The tags below are used to designate the abundance of some species. Because the NPS checklist notes abundance by season, the tag for the highest abundance of the year is used. The quoted definitions are those of the NPS.

- B = Breeding: "Confirmed as breeding in Yellowstone" (155 species)
- b = Unconfirmed breeding: "Suspected of breeding, but not confirmed by eggs or young" (four species)
- U = Uncommon: "Found in small numbers and usually, but not always, found with some effort in appropriate habitat" (64 species)
- R = Rare: "Occurs annually in very small numbers or in a very restricted habitat. Difficult to find" (76 species)
- O = Occasional: "Occurs in some years, but not every year" (four species)
- V = Vagrant: "accidental, vagrant, or species with few observations" for which documentation is requested (66 species)
- I = Introduced - a species introduced to North America by humans (seven species)

== Ducks, geese, and waterfowl ==
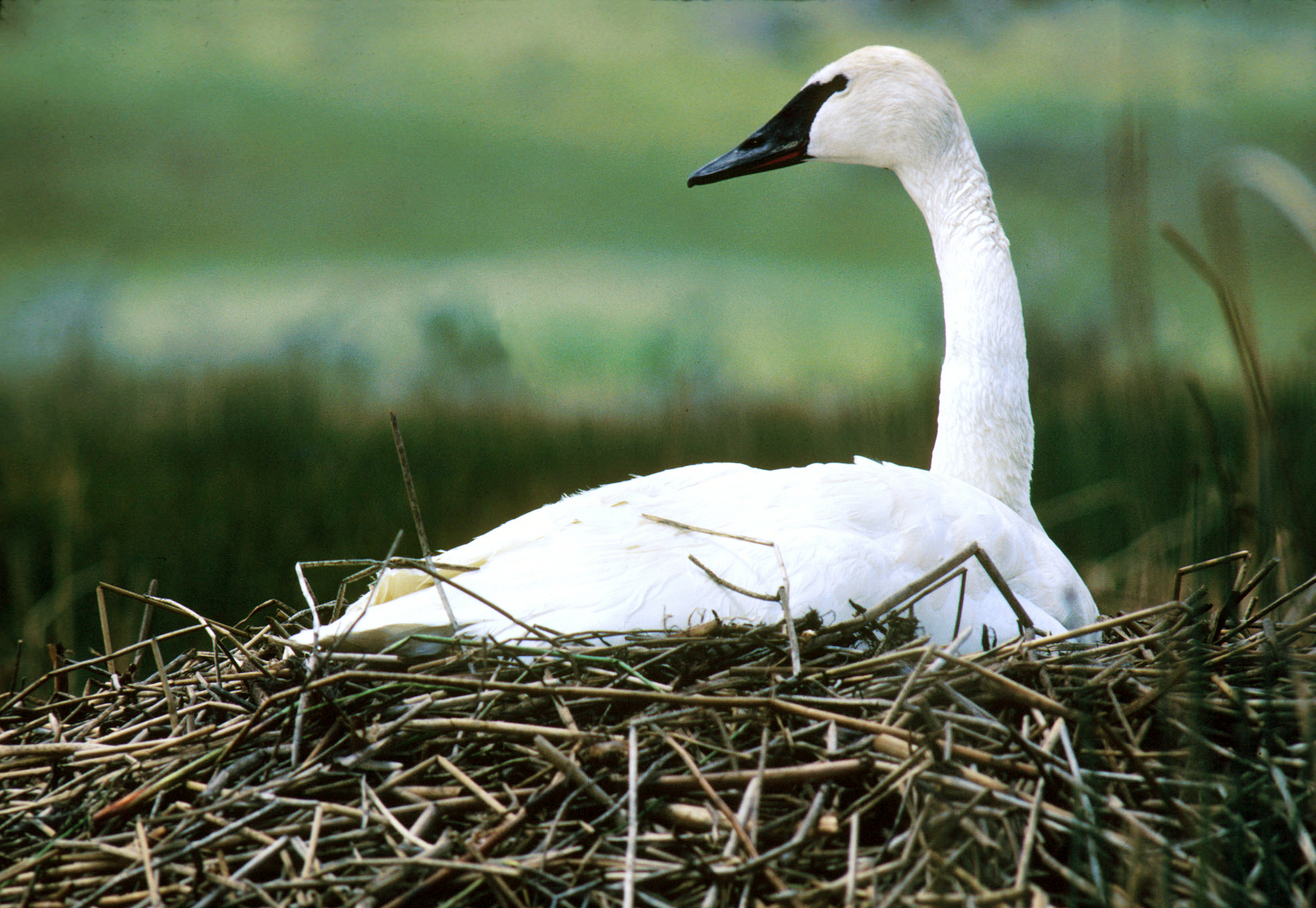
Trumpeter swan on nest

Order: Anseriformes Family: Anatidae

The family Anatidae includes the ducks and most duck-like waterfowl, such as geese and swans. These birds are adapted to an aquatic existence with webbed feet, bills which are flattened to a greater or lesser extent, and feathers that are excellent at shedding water due to special oils. Thirty-four species have been recorded in Yellowstone.

Common name	Binomial	Status
Snow goose	Anser caerulescens	R
Ross's goose	Anser rossii	R
Greater white-fronted goose	Anser albifrons	V
Cackling goose	Branta hutchinsii	V
Canada goose	Branta canadensis	B
Trumpeter swan	Cygnus buccinator	B
Tundra swan	Cygnus columbianus	U
Whooper swan	Cygnus cygnus	V
Wood duck	Aix sponsa	R
Blue-winged teal	Spatula discors	B U
Cinnamon teal	Spatula cyanoptera	B
Northern shoveler	Spatula clypeata	B
Gadwall	Mareca strepera	B
Eurasian wigeon	Mareca penelope	V
American wigeon	Mareca americana	B
Mallard	Anas platyrhynchos	B
Northern pintail	Anas acuta	B
Green-winged teal	Anas crecca	B
Canvasback	Aythya valisineria	B U
Redhead	Aythya americana	B U
Ring-necked duck	Aythya collaris	B
Greater scaup	Aythya marila	R
Lesser scaup	Aythya affinis	B
Harlequin duck	Histrionicus histrionicus	B U
Surf scoter	Melanitta perspicillata	V
White-winged scoter	Melanitta deglandi	V
Long-tailed duck	Clangula hyemalis	V
Bufflehead	Bucephala albeola	B
Common goldeneye	Bucephala clangula	
Barrow's goldeneye	Bucephala islandica	B
Hooded merganser	Lophodytes cucullatus	B R
Common merganser	Mergus merganser	B
Red-breasted merganser	Mergus serrator	U
Ruddy duck	Oxyura jamaicensis	B

== Pheasants, grouse, and allies ==
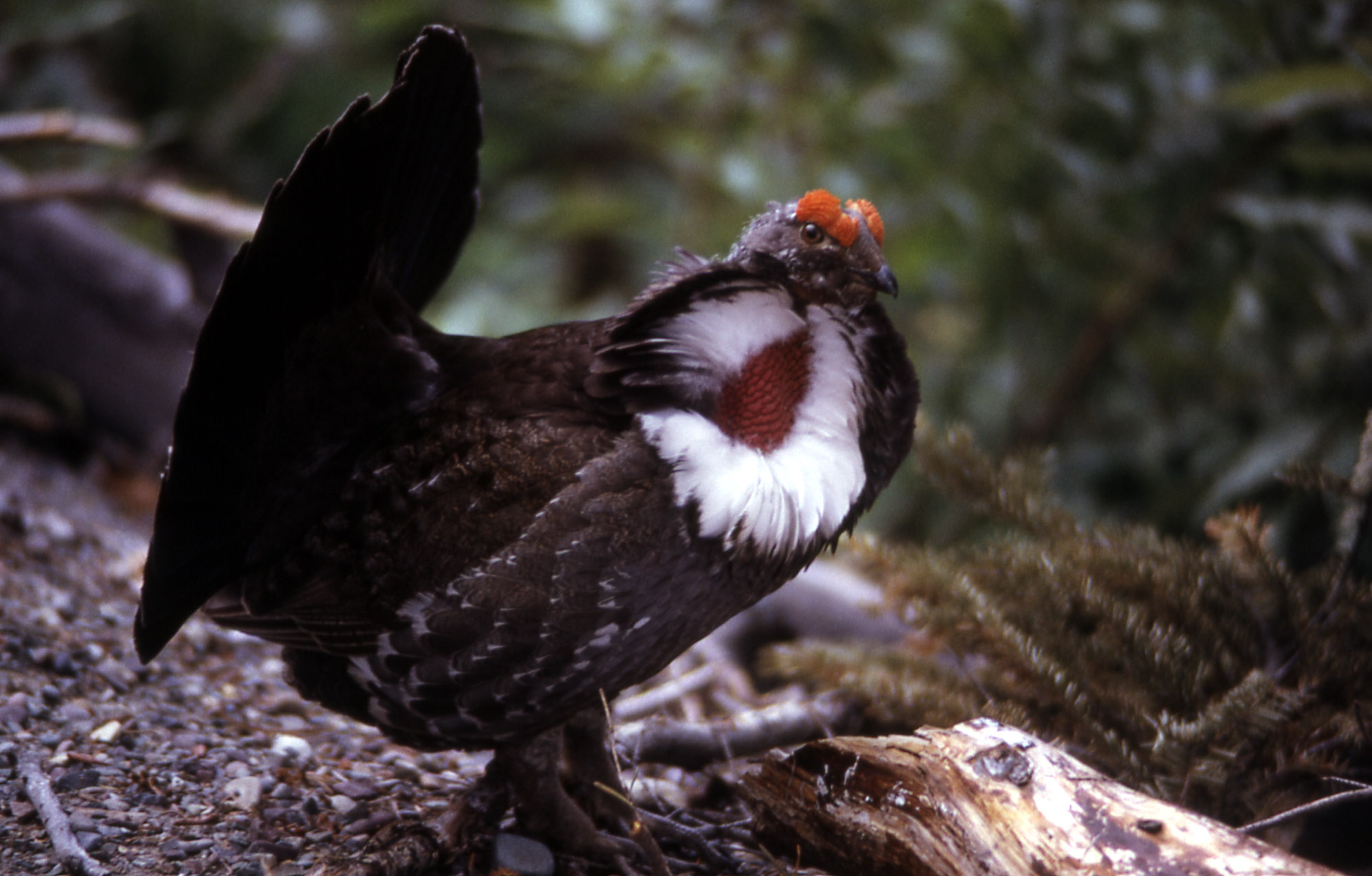
Dusky grouse

Order: Galliformes Family: Phasianidae

Phasianidae consists of the pheasants and their allies. These are terrestrial species, variable in size but generally plump with broad relatively short wings. Many species are gamebirds or have been domesticated as a food source for humans. Eight species have been recorded in Yellowstone.

Common name	Binomial	Status
Wild turkey	Meleagris gallopavo	V
Ruffed grouse	Bonasa umbellus	B
Dusky grouse	Dendragapus obscurus	B
Gray partridge	Perdix perdix	I V
Chukar	Alectoris chukar	V

== Grebes ==
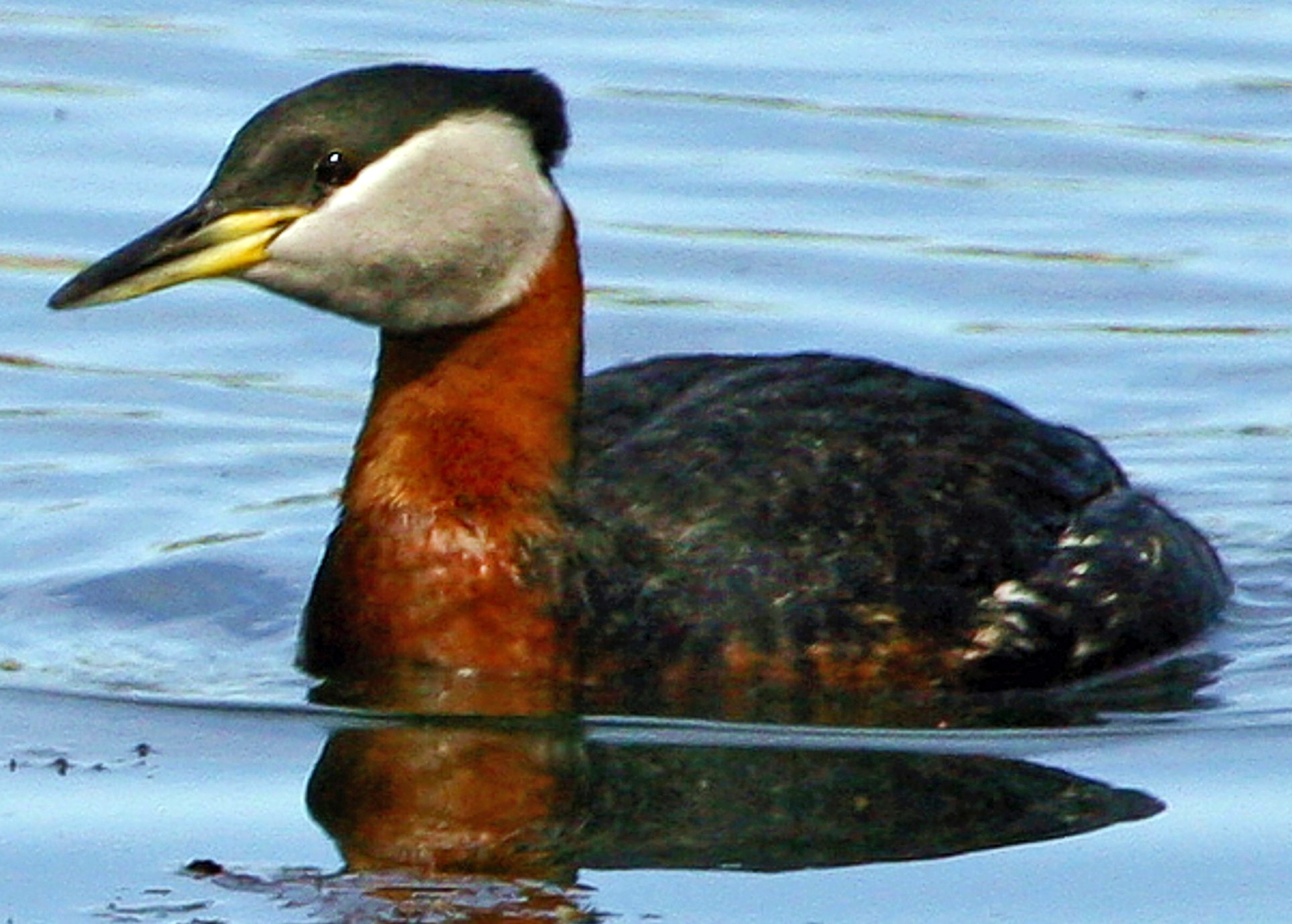
Red-necked grebe

Order: Podicipediformes Family: Podicipedidae

Grebes are small to medium-large freshwater diving birds. They have lobed toes and are excellent swimmers and divers. However, they have their feet placed far back on the body, making them quite ungainly on land. Six species have been recorded in Yellowstone.

Common name	Binomial	Status
Pied-billed grebe	Podilymbus podiceps	B
Horned grebe	Podiceps auritus	B R
Red-necked grebe	Podiceps grisegena	B R
Eared grebe	Podiceps nigricollis	B U
Western grebe	Aechmophorus occidentalis	b R
Clark's grebe	Aechmophorus clarkii	R

== Pigeons and doves ==
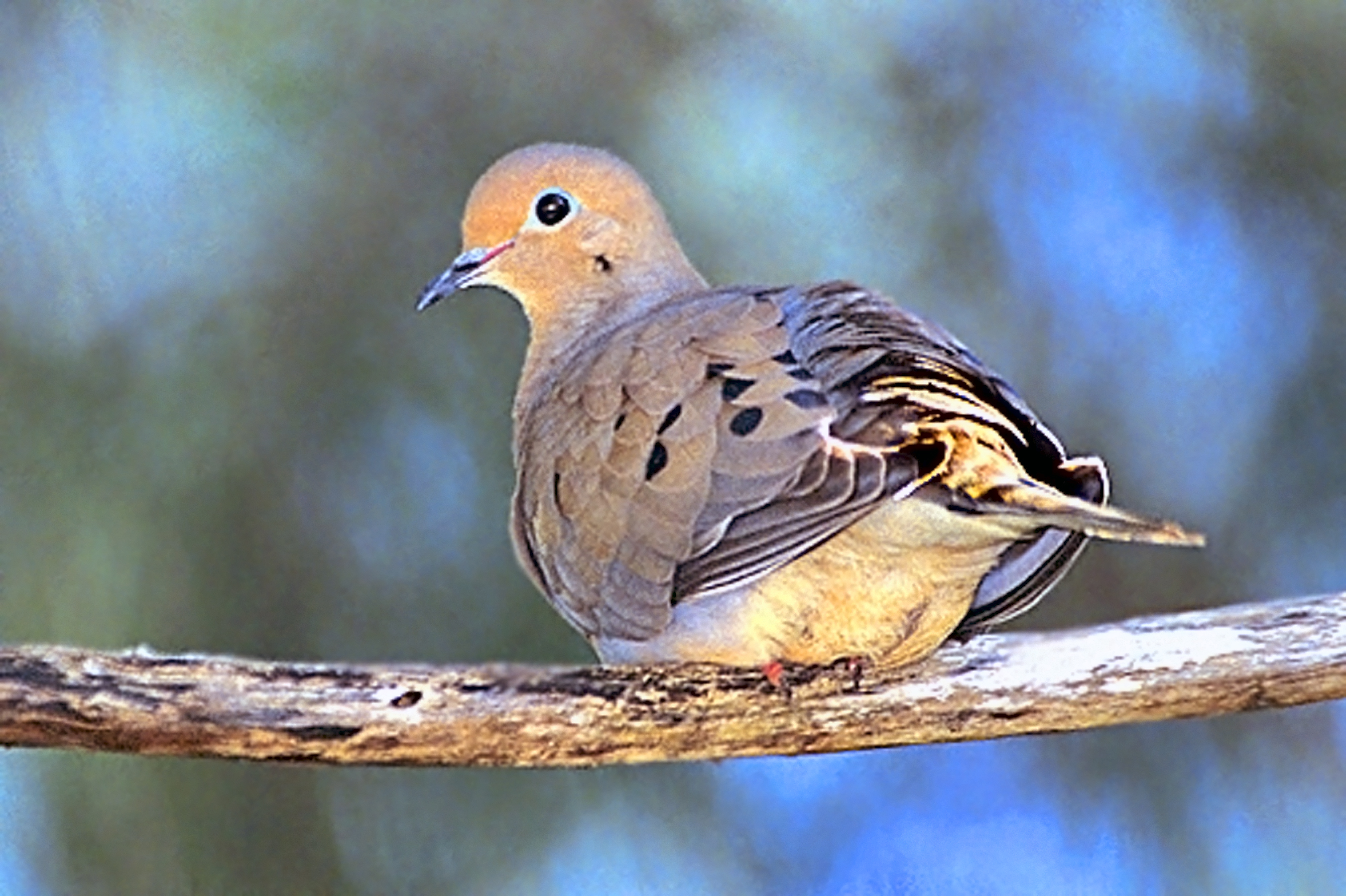
Mourning dove

Order: Columbiformes Family: Columbidae

Pigeons and doves are stout-bodied birds with short necks and short slender bills with a fleshy cere. Four species have been recorded in Yellowstone.

Common name	Binomial	Status
Mourning dove	Zenaida macroura	B R
Band-tailed pigeon	Patagioenas fasciata	V
Eurasian collared-dove	Streptopelia decaocto	I R
Rock pigeon	Columba livia	I B U

== Cuckoos ==
Order: Cuculiformes Family: Cuculidae

The family Cuculidae includes cuckoos, roadrunners, and anis. These birds are of variable size with slender bodies, long tails, and strong legs. One species has been recorded in Yellowstone.

Common name	Binomial	Status
Black-billed cuckoo	Coccyzus erythropthalmus	V

== Nightjars and allies ==
Order: Caprimulgiformes Family: Caprimulgidae

Nightjars are medium-sized nocturnal birds that usually nest on the ground. They have long wings, short legs, and very short bills. Most have small feet, of little use for walking, and long pointed wings. Their soft plumage is cryptically colored to resemble bark or leaves. Two species have been recorded in Yellowstone.

Common name	Binomial	Status
Common nighthawk	Chordeiles minor	B

== Swifts ==
Order: Apodiformes Family: Apodidae

The swifts are small birds which spend the majority of their lives flying. These birds have very short legs and never settle voluntarily on the ground, perching instead only on vertical surfaces. Many swifts have very long, swept-back wings which resemble a crescent or boomerang. One species has been recorded in Yellowstone.

Common name	Binomial	Status
White-throated swift	Aeronautes saxatalis	B U

== Hummingbirds ==
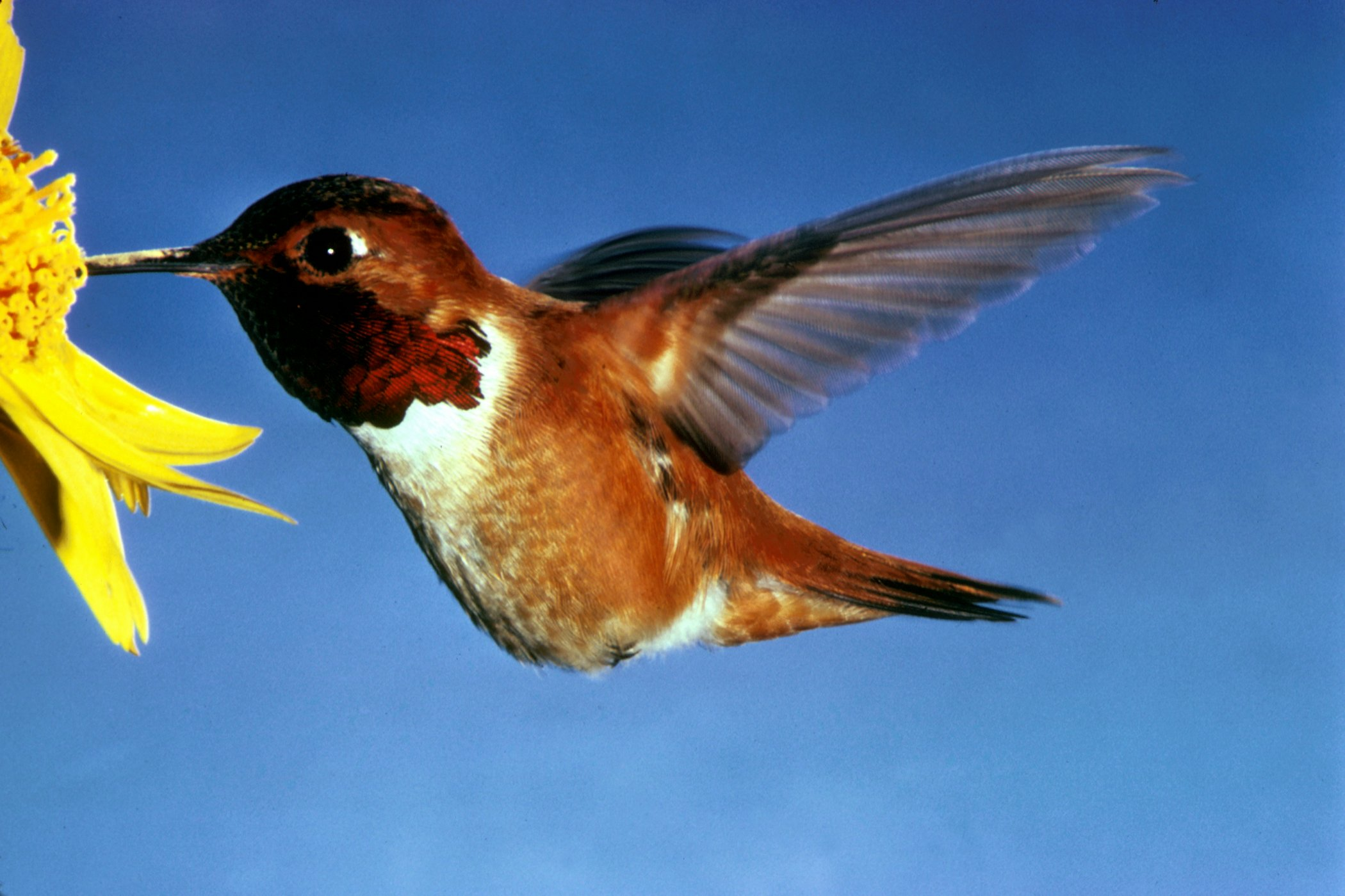
Rufous hummingbird

Order: Apodiformes Family: Trochilidae

Hummingbirds are small birds capable of hovering in mid-air due to the rapid flapping of their wings. They are the only birds that can fly backwards. Four species have been recorded in Yellowstone.

Common name	Binomial	Status
Calliope hummingbird	Selasphorus calliope	B R
Rufous hummingbird	Selasphorus rufus	B R
Broad-tailed hummingbird	Selasphorus platycercus	B R

== Cranes ==
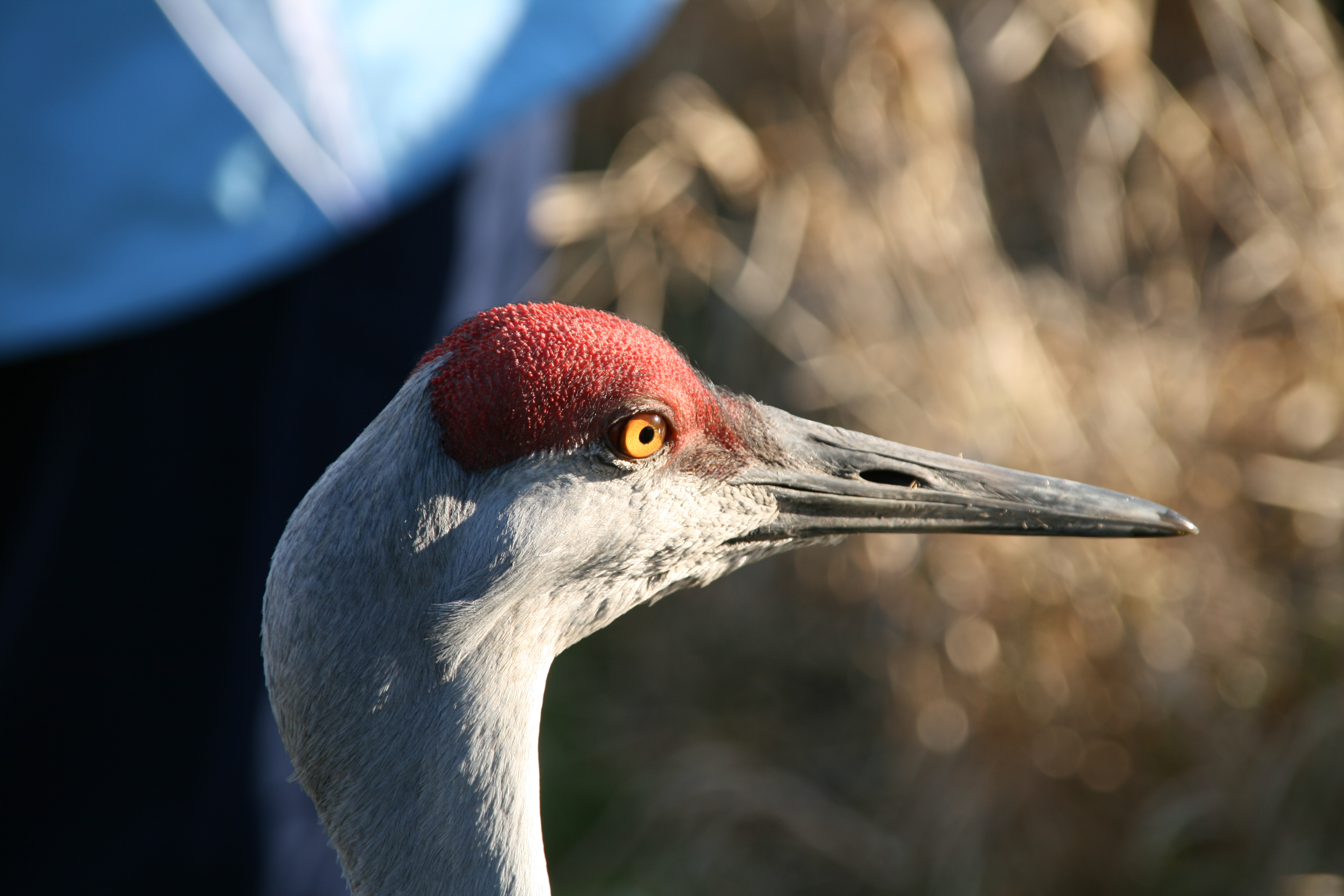
Sandhill crane

Order: Gruiformes Family: Gruidae

Cranes are large, long-legged, and long-necked birds. Unlike the similar-looking but unrelated herons, cranes fly with necks outstretched, not pulled back. Most have elaborate and noisy courting displays or "dances". Two species have been recorded in Yellowstone.

Common name	Binomial	Status
Sandhill crane	Antigone canadensis	B
Whooping crane	Grus americana	V

== Rails, gallinules, and coots ==
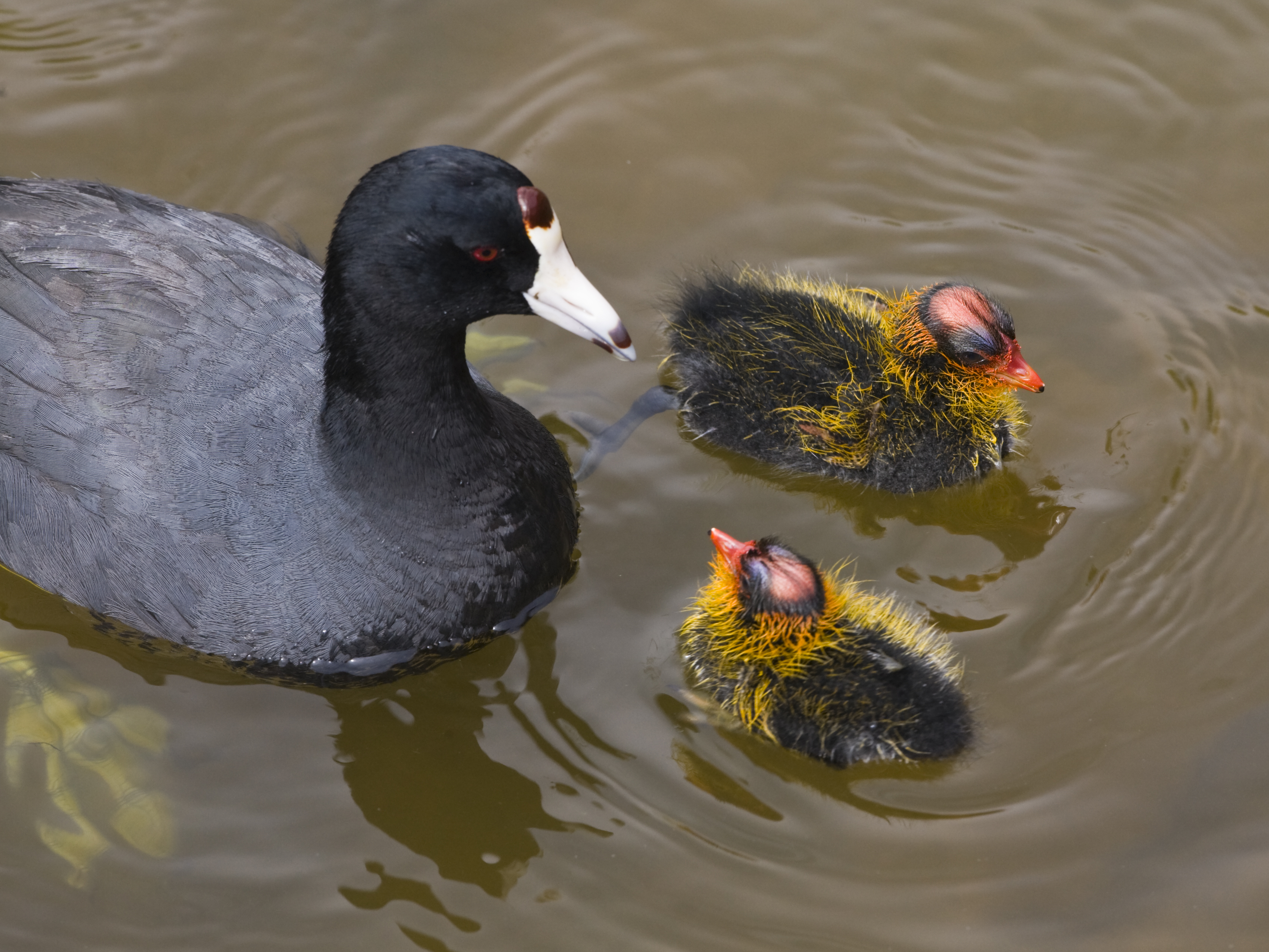
American coot

Order: Gruiformes Family: Rallidae

Rallidae is a large family of small to medium-sized birds which includes the rails, crakes, coots, and gallinules. The most typical family members occupy dense vegetation in damp environments near lakes, swamps, or rivers. In general they are shy and secretive birds, making them difficult to observe. Most species have strong legs and long toes which are well adapted to soft uneven surfaces. They tend to have short, rounded wings and tend to be weak fliers. Five species have been recorded in Yellowstone.

Common name	Binomial	Status
Virginia rail	Rallus limicola	B R
Sora	Porzana carolina	B
American coot	Fulica americana	B
Yellow rail	Coturnicops noveboracensis	V

== Stilts and avocets ==
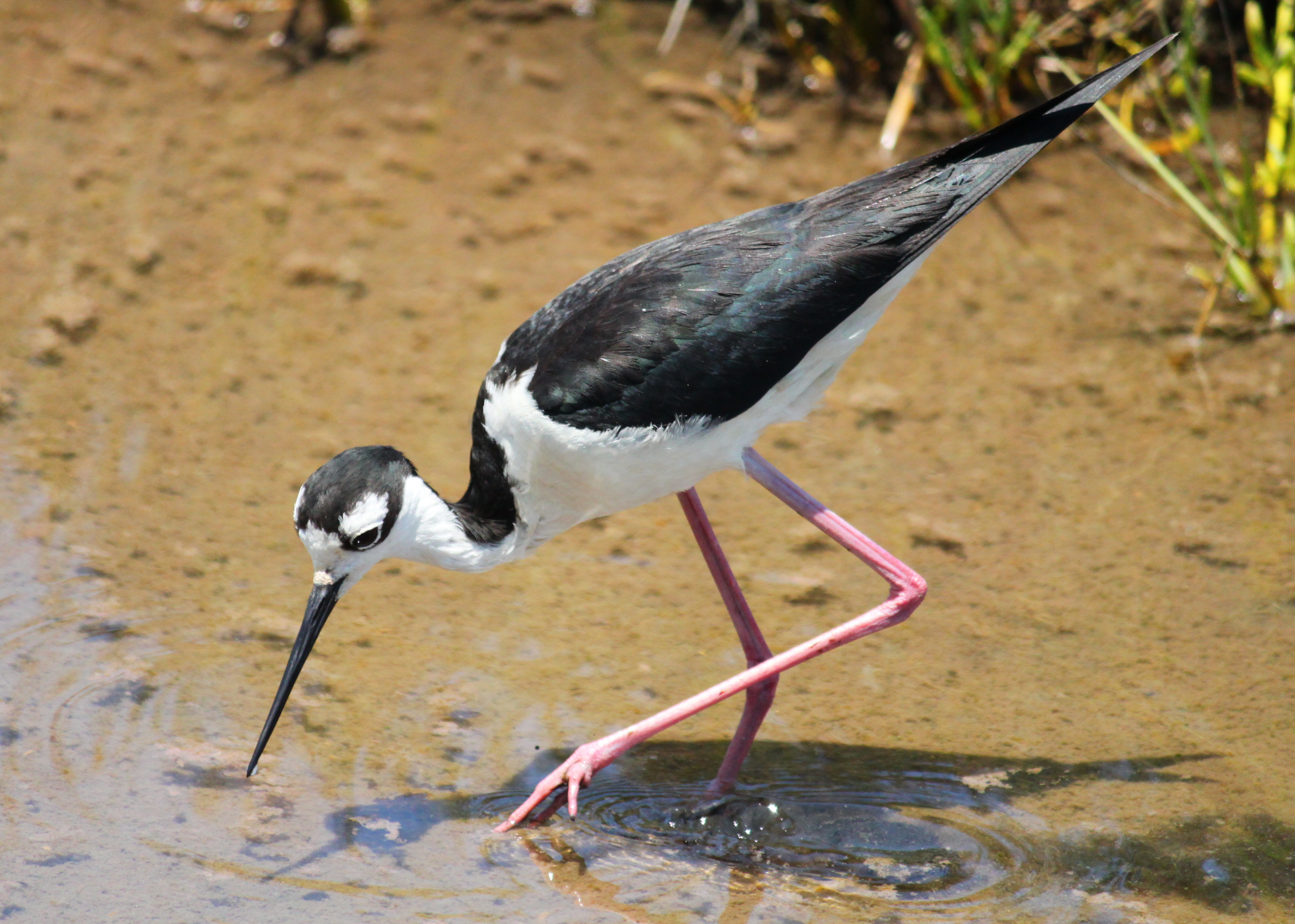
Black-necked stilt

Order: Charadriiformes Family: Recurvirostridae

Recurvirostridae is a family of large wading birds which includes the avocets and stilts. The avocets have long legs and long up-curved bills. The stilts have extremely long legs and long, thin, straight bills. Two species have been recorded in Yellowstone.

Common name	Binomial	Status
Black-necked stilt	Himantopus mexicanus	R
American avocet	Recurvirostra americana	R

== Plovers and lapwings ==
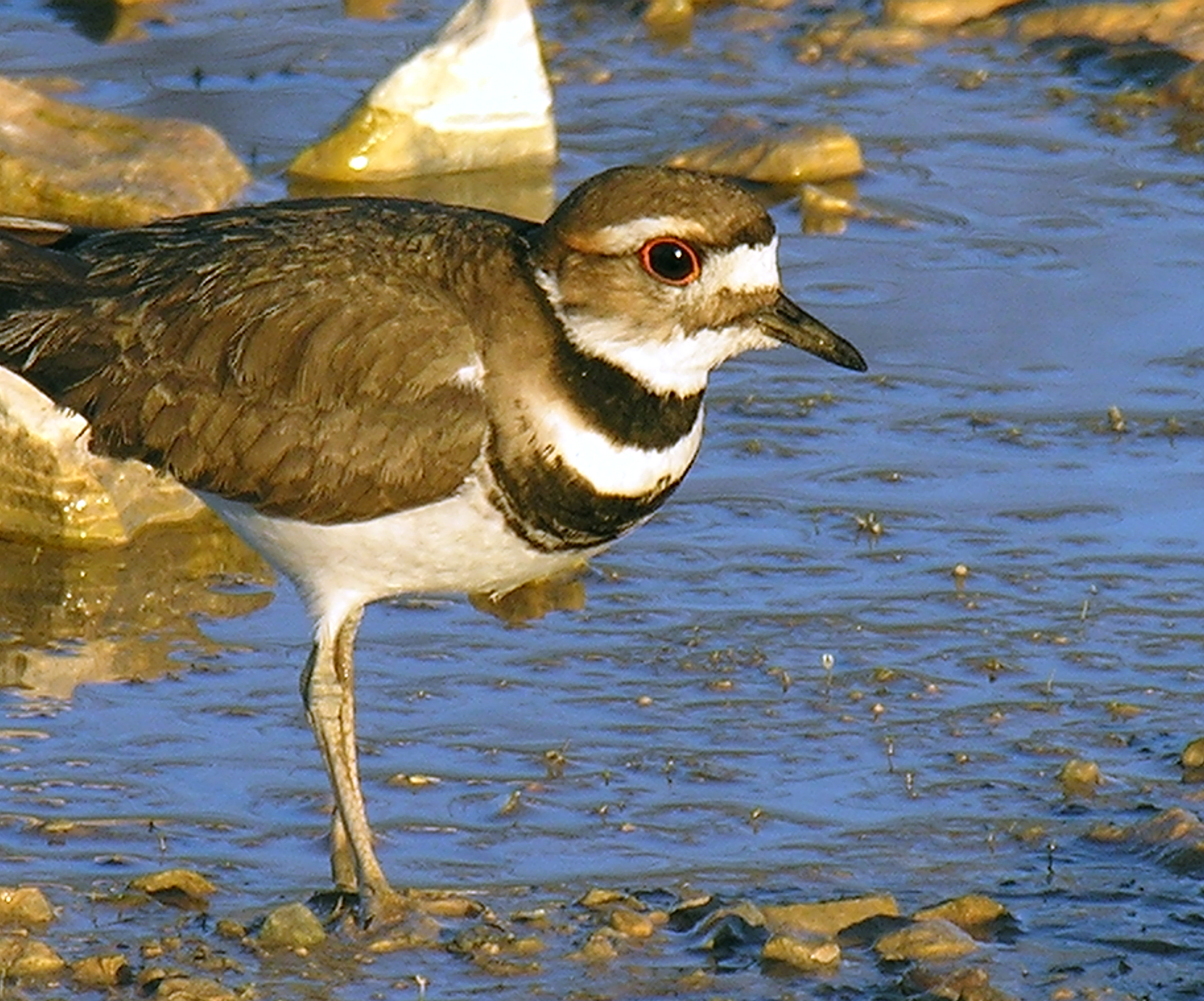
Killdeer

Order: Charadriiformes Family: Charadriidae

The family Charadriidae includes the plovers, dotterels, and lapwings. They are small to medium-sized birds with compact bodies, short thick necks, and long, usually pointed, wings. They are found in open country worldwide, mostly in habitats near water. Four species have been recorded in Yellowstone.

Common name	Binomial	Status
Black-bellied plover	Pluvialis squatarola	R
Killdeer	Charadrius vociferus	B
Semipalmated plover	Charadrius semipalmatus	R

== Sandpipers and allies ==
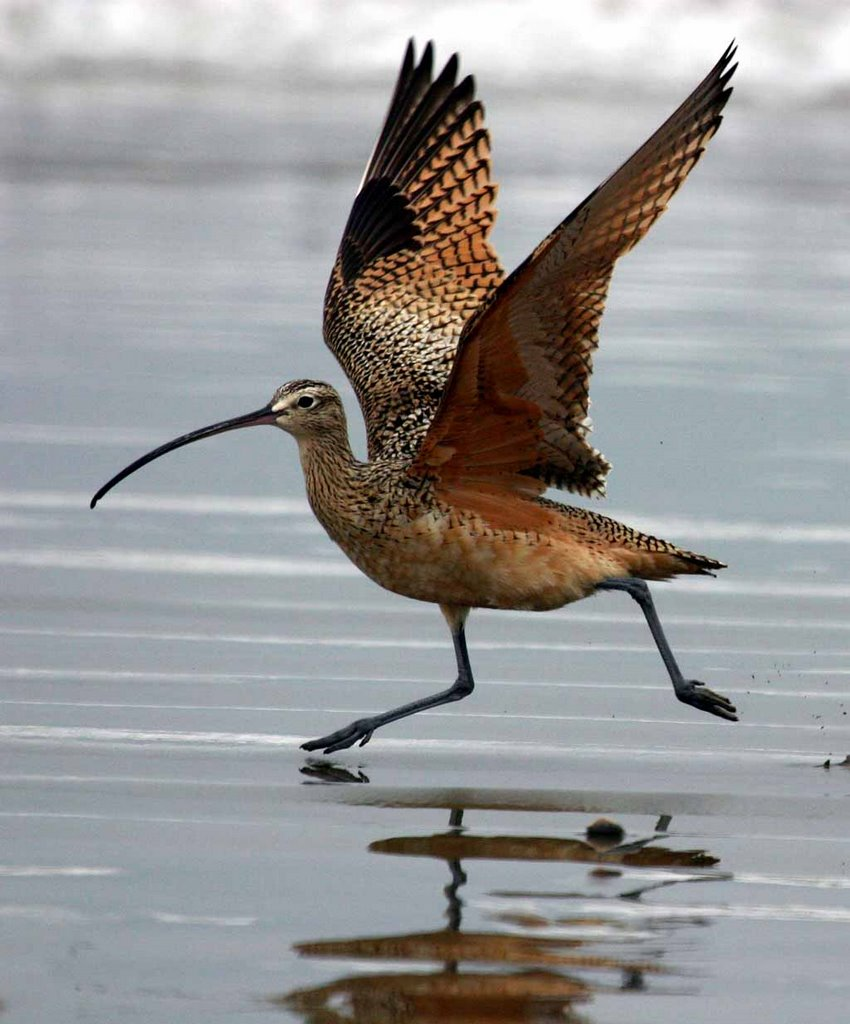
Long-billed curlew

Order: Charadriiformes Family: Scolopacidae

Scolopacidae is a large diverse family of small to medium-sized shorebirds including the sandpipers, curlews, godwits, shanks, tattlers, woodcocks, snipes, dowitchers, and phalaropes. The majority of these species eat small invertebrates picked out of the mud or soil. Different lengths of legs and bills enable multiple species to feed in the same habitat, particularly on the coast, without direct competition for food. Twenty-three species have been recorded in Yellowstone.

Common name	Binomial	Status
Upland sandpiper	Bartramia longicauda	R
Long-billed curlew	Numenius americanus	B R
Marbled godwit	Limosa fedoa	R
Ruddy turnstone	Arenaria interpres	R
Sanderling	Calidris alba	R
Baird's sandpiper	Calidris bairdii	U
Least sandpiper	Calidris minutilla	R
White-rumped sandpiper	Calidris fuscicollis	R
Pectoral sandpiper	Calidris melanotos	R
Semipalmated sandpiper	Calidris pusilla	R
Western sandpiper	Calidris mauri	R
Short-billed dowitcher	Limnodromus griseus	R
Long-billed dowitcher	Limnodromus scolopaceus	U
Wilson's snipe	Gallinago delicata	B
Spotted sandpiper	Actitis macularia	B
Solitary sandpiper	Tringa solitaria	R
Lesser yellowlegs	Tringa flavipes	R
Willet	Tringa semipalmata	U
Greater yellowlegs	Tringa melanoleuca	U
Wilson's phalarope	Phalaropus tricolor	B U
Red-necked phalarope	Phalaropus lobatus	R

== Gulls, terns, and skimmers ==
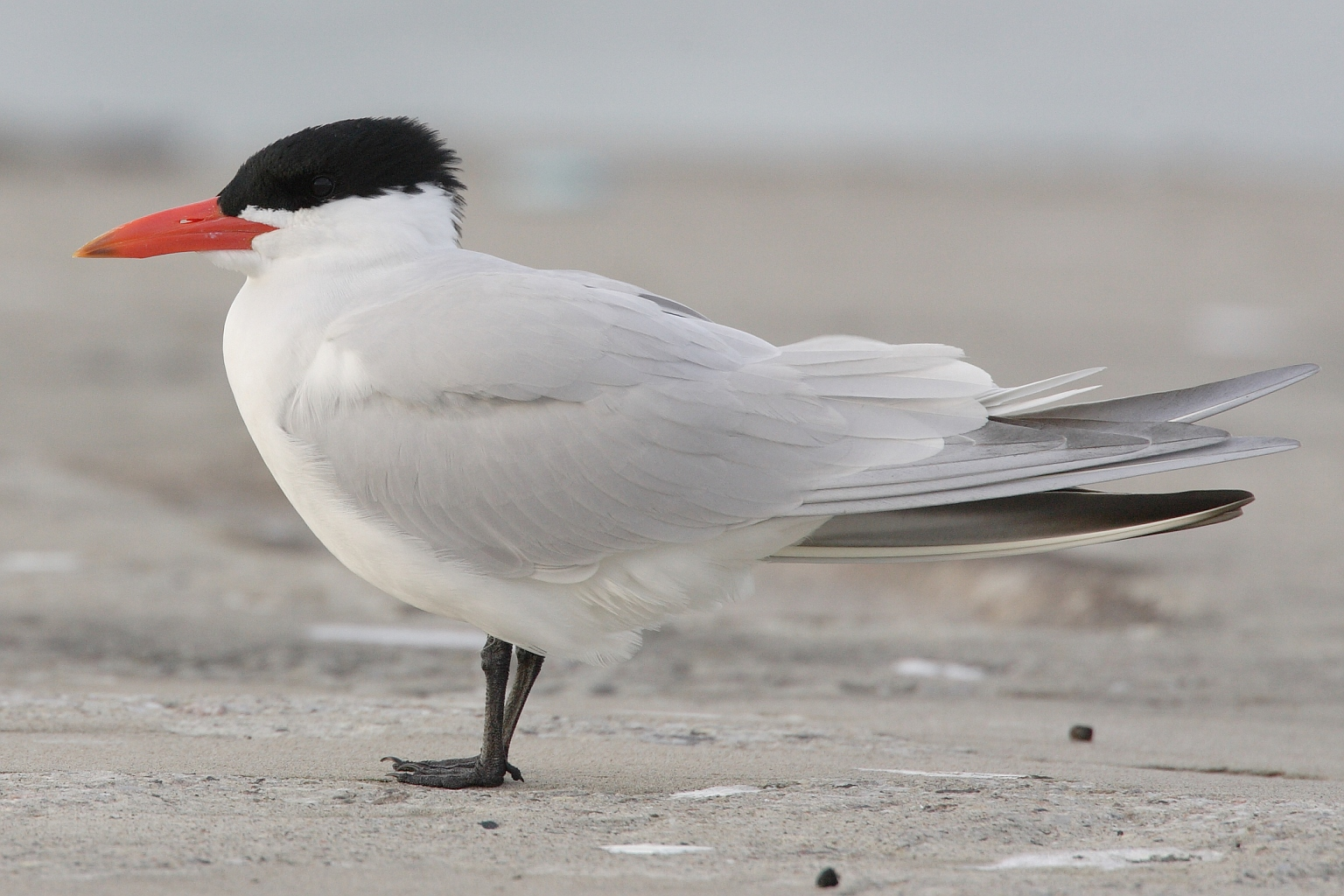
Caspian tern

Order: Charadriiformes Family: Laridae

Laridae is a family of medium to large seabirds which includes gulls, terns, kittiwakes, and skimmers. They are typically gray or white, often with black markings on the head or wings. They have stout, longish bills and webbed feet. Twelve species have been recorded in Yellowstone.

Common name	Binomial	Status
Sabine's gull	Xema sabini	V
Bonaparte's gull	Larus philadelphia	R
Franklin's gull	Larus pipixcan	R
Short-billed gull	Larus brachyrhynchus	V
Ring-billed gull	Larus delawarensis	
California gull	Larus californicus	B
Herring gull	Larus argentatus	R
Caspian tern	Hydroprogne caspia	B R
Black tern	Chlidonias niger	V
Common tern	Sterna hirundo	R
Arctic tern	Sterna paradisaea	V
Forster's tern	Sterna forsteri	B R

== Loons ==
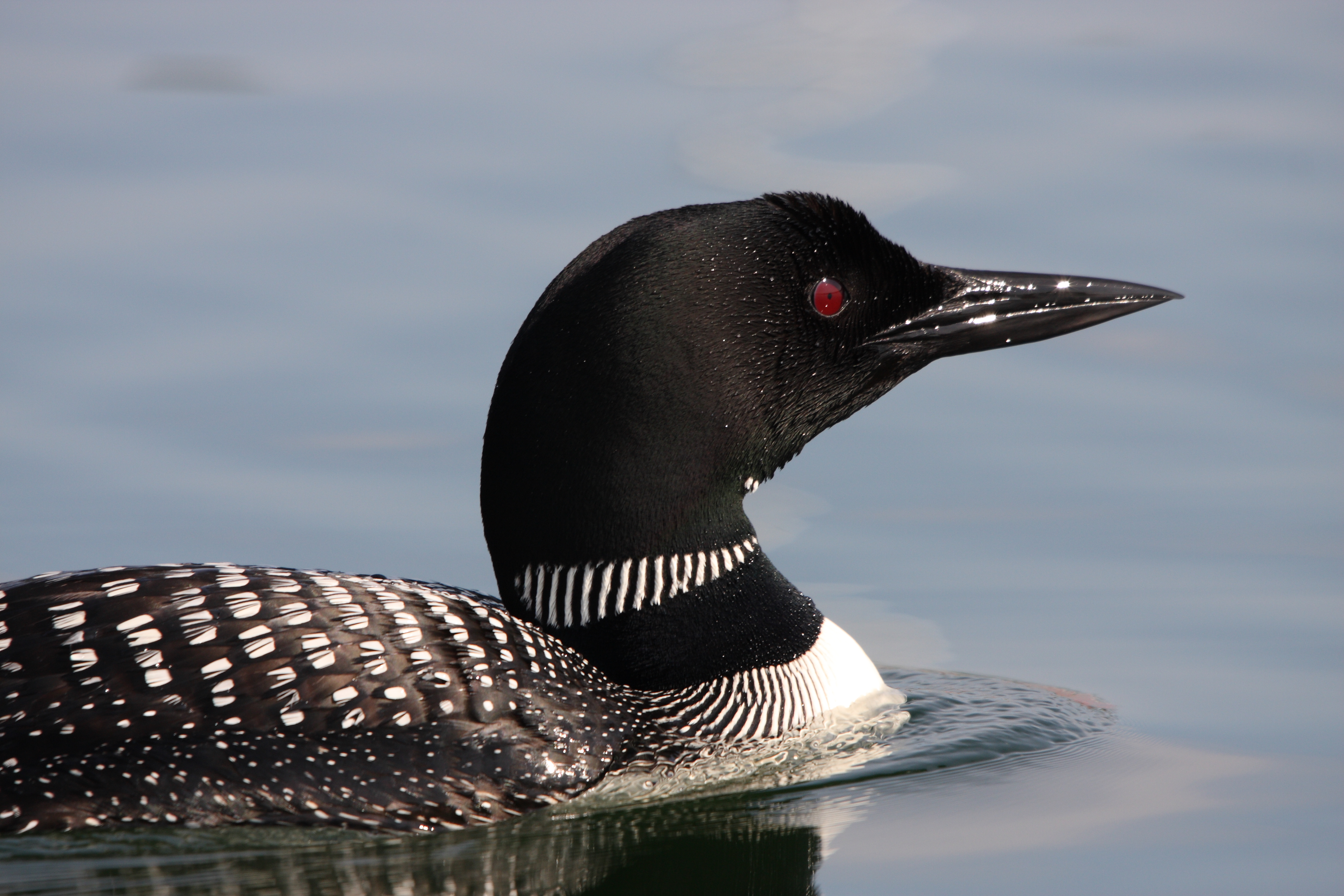
Common loon

Order: Gaviiformes Family: Gaviidae

Loons are aquatic birds the size of a large duck, to which they are unrelated. Their plumage is largely gray or black, and they have spear-shaped bills. Loons swim well and fly adequately, but are almost hopeless on land, because their legs are placed towards the rear of the body. Two species have been recorded in Yellowstone.

Common name	Binomial	Status
Pacific loon	Gavia pacifica	V
Common loon	Gavia immer	B U

== Cormorants and shags ==
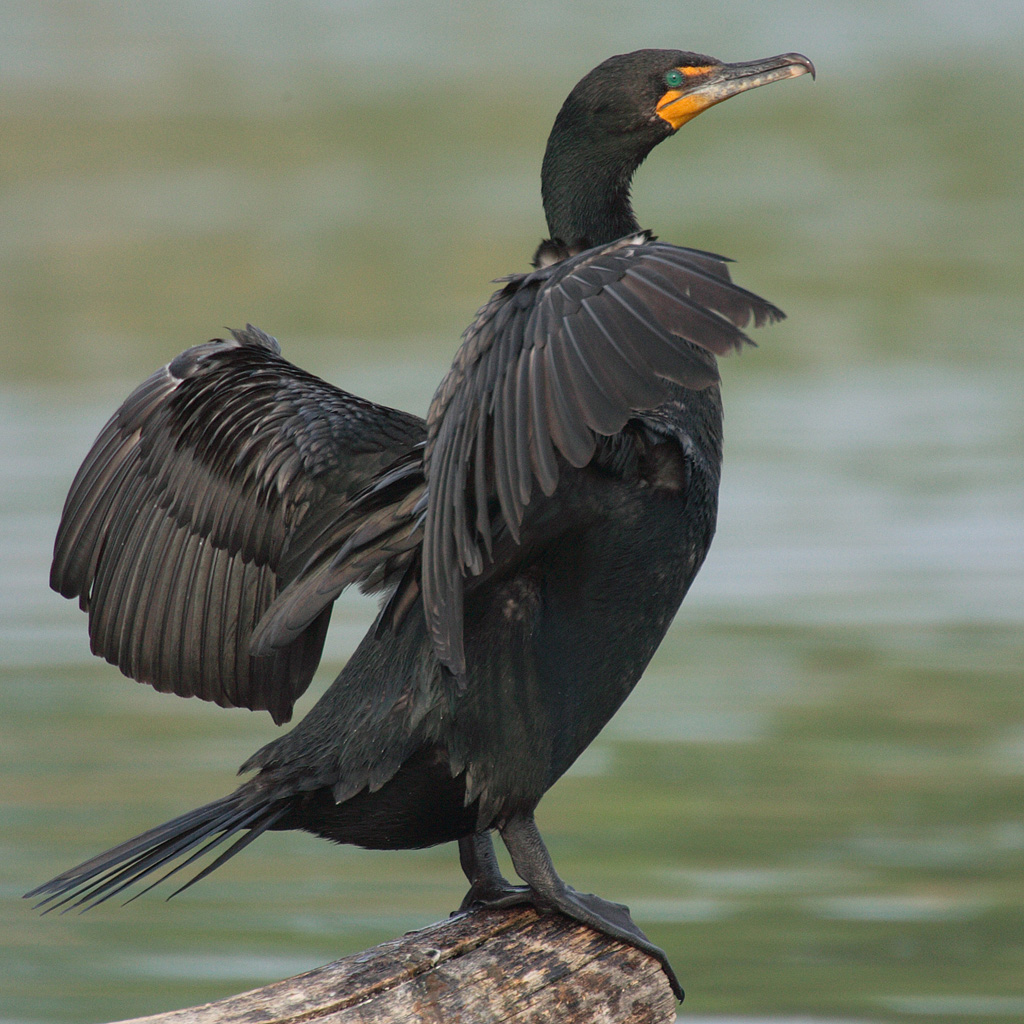
Double-crested cormorant

Order: Suliformes Family: Phalacrocoracidae

Cormorants are medium-to-large aquatic birds, usually with mainly dark plumage and areas of colored skin on the face. The bill is long, thin, and sharply hooked. Their feet are four-toed and webbed. One species has been recorded in Yellowstone.

Common name	Binomial	Status
Double-crested cormorant	Nannopterum auritum	B U

== Ibises and spoonbills ==
Order: Pelecaniformes Family: Threskiornithidae

The family Threskiornithidae includes the ibises and spoonbills. They have long, broad wings. Their bodies tend to be elongated, the neck more so, with rather long legs. The bill is also long, decurved in the case of the ibises, straight and distinctively flattened in the spoonbills. One species has been recorded in Yellowstone.

Common name	Binomial	Status
White-faced ibis	Plegadis chihi	R

== Pelicans ==
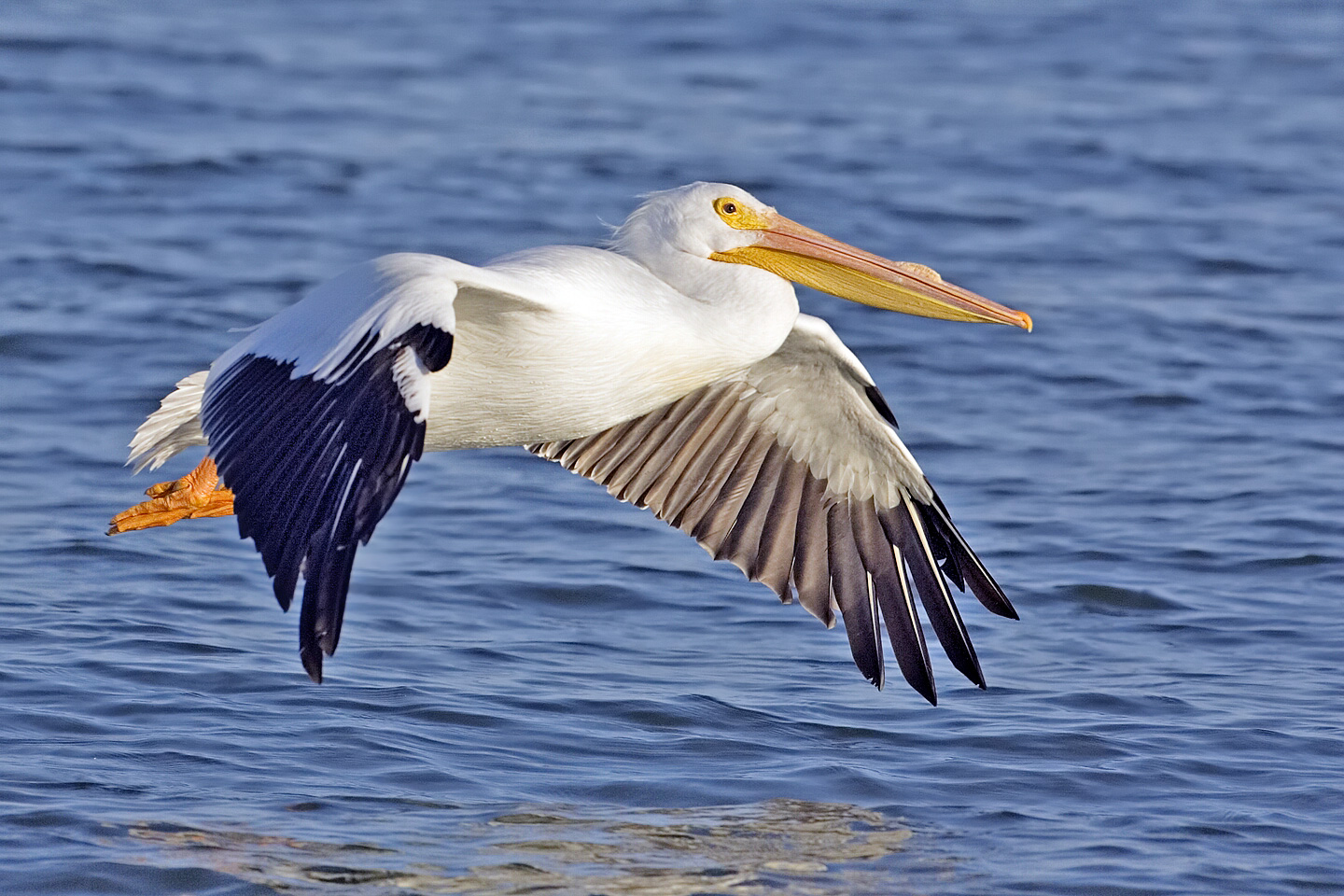
American white pelican

Order: Pelecaniformes Family: Pelecanidae

Pelicans are very large water birds with a distinctive pouch under their beak. Like other birds in the order Pelecaniformes, they have four webbed toes. One species has been recorded in Yellowstone.

Common name	Binomial	Status
American white pelican	Pelecanus erythrorhynchos	B

== Herons, egrets, and bitterns ==
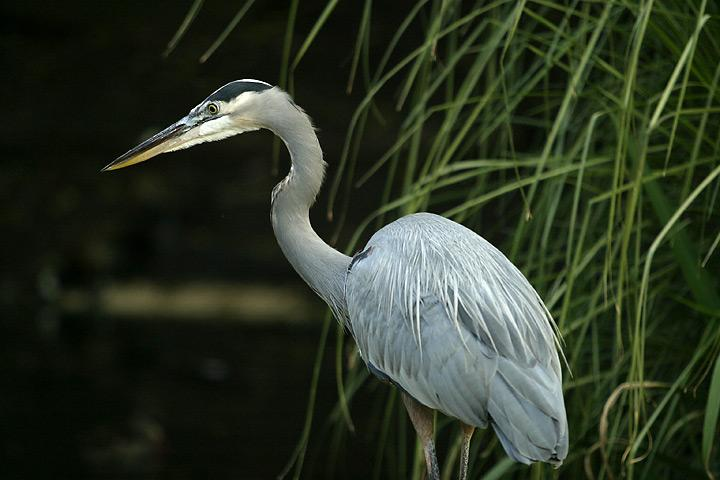
Great blue heron

Order: Pelecaniformes Family: Ardeidae

The family Ardeidae contains the herons, egrets, and bitterns. Herons and egrets are medium to large wading birds with long necks and legs. Bitterns tend to be shorter-necked and more secretive. Members of Ardeidae fly with their necks retracted, unlike other long-necked birds such as storks, ibises, and spoonbills. Eight species have been recorded in Yellowstone.

Common name	Binomial	Status
American bittern	Botaurus lentiginosus	V
Great blue heron	Ardea herodias	B
Great egret	Ardea alba	V
Snowy egret	Egretta thula	V
Tricolored heron	Egretta tricolor	V
Cattle egret	Bubulcus ibis	V
Green heron	Butorides virescens	V
Black-crowned night-heron	Nycticorax nycticorax	R

== New World vultures ==
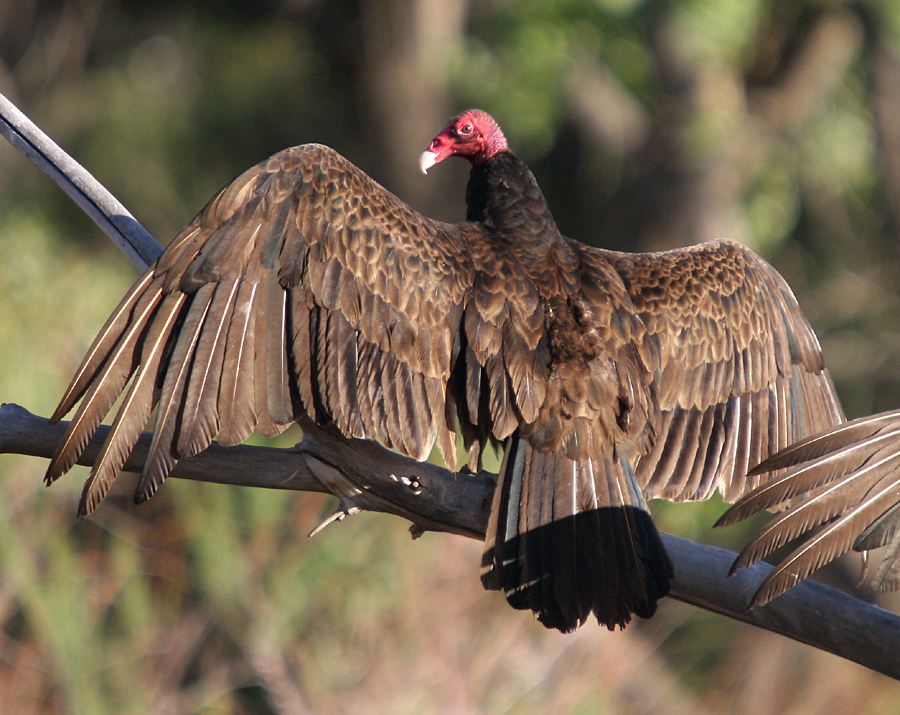
Turkey vulture

Order: Cathartiformes Family: Cathartidae

The New World vultures are not closely related to Old World vultures, but superficially resemble them because of convergent evolution. Like the Old World vultures, they are scavengers; however, unlike Old World vultures, which find carcasses by sight, New World vultures have a good sense of smell with which they locate carcasses. One species has been recorded in Yellowstone.

Common name	Binomial	Status
Turkey vulture	Cathartes aura	U

== Osprey ==
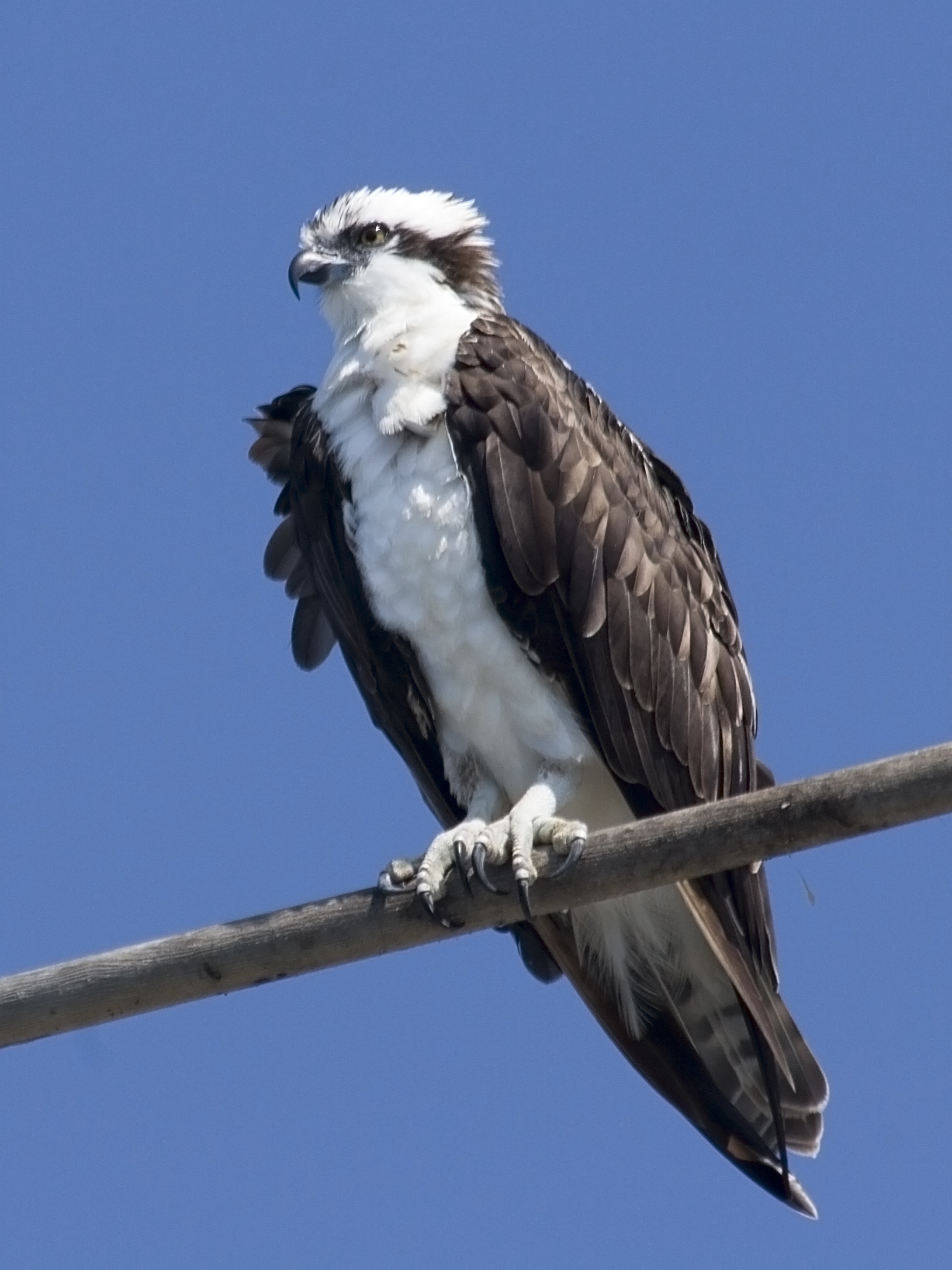
Osprey

Order: Accipitriformes Family: Pandionidae

Pandionidae is a family of fish-eating birds of prey possessing a very large, powerful hooked beak for tearing flesh from their prey, strong legs, powerful talons, and keen eyesight. The family is monotypic.

Common name	Binomial	Status
Osprey	Pandion haliaetus	B

== Hawks, eagles, and kites ==
Order: Accipitriformes Family: Accipitridae

Accipitridae is a family of birds of prey which includes hawks, eagles, kites, harriers, and Old World vultures. These birds have very large powerful hooked beaks for tearing flesh from their prey, strong legs, powerful talons, and keen eyesight. Twelve species have been recorded in Yellowstone.

Common name	Binomial	Status
Golden eagle	Aquila chrysaetos	B U
Sharp-shinned hawk	Accipiter striatus	B U
Cooper's hawk	Astur cooperii	B U
American goshawk	Astur atricapillus	B U
Northern harrier	Circus cyaneus	B U
Bald eagle	Haliaeetus leucocephalus	B
Red-shouldered hawk	Buteo lineatus	V
Broad-winged hawk	Buteo platypterus	R
Swainson's hawk	Buteo swainsoni	B
Red-tailed hawk	Buteo jamaicensis	B
Rough-legged hawk	Buteo lagopus	U
Ferruginous hawk	Buteo regalis	U

== Owls ==
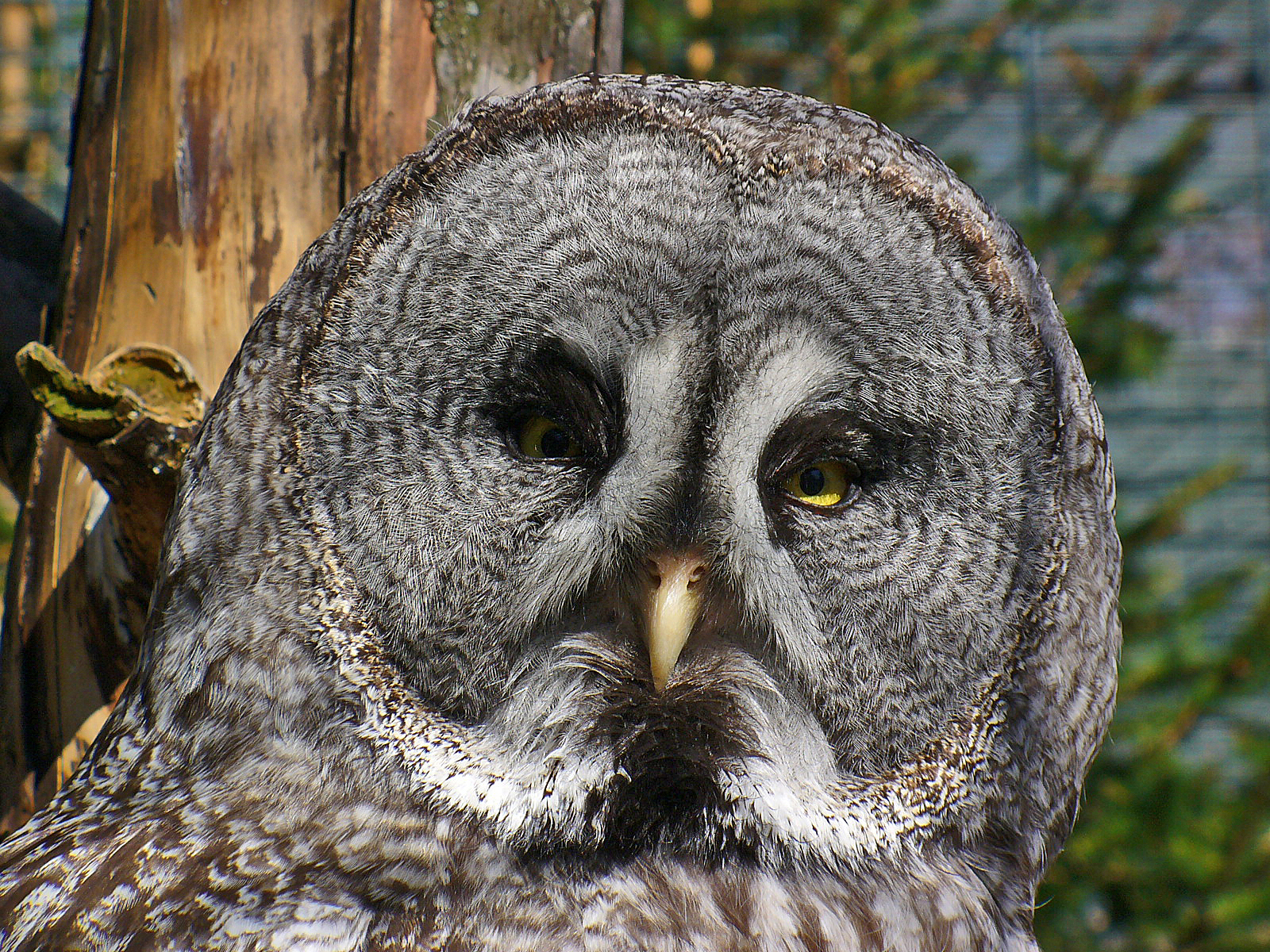
Great gray owl

Order: Strigiformes Family: Strigidae

Typical owls are small to large solitary nocturnal birds of prey. They have large forward-facing eyes and ears, a hawk-like beak, and a conspicuous circle of feathers around each eye called a facial disk. Eleven species have been recorded in Yellowstone.

Common name	Binomial	Status
Flammulated owl	Psiloscops flammeolus	V
Western screech-owl	Megascops kennicottii	V
Great horned owl	Bubo virginianus	B
Snowy owl	Bubo scandiacus	V
Northern pygmy-owl	Glaucidium gnoma	B R
Burrowing owl	Athene cunicularia	V
Great gray owl	Strix nebulosa	B U
Long-eared owl	Asio otus	B R
Short-eared owl	Asio flammeus	B R
Boreal owl	Aegolius funereus	B R
Northern saw-whet owl	Aegolius acadicus	B R

== Kingfishers ==
Order: Coraciiformes Family: Alcedinidae

Kingfishers are medium-sized birds with large heads, long pointed bills, short legs, and stubby tails. One species has been recorded in Yellowstone.

Common name	Binomial	Status
Belted kingfisher	Megaceryle alcyon	B U

== Woodpeckers ==
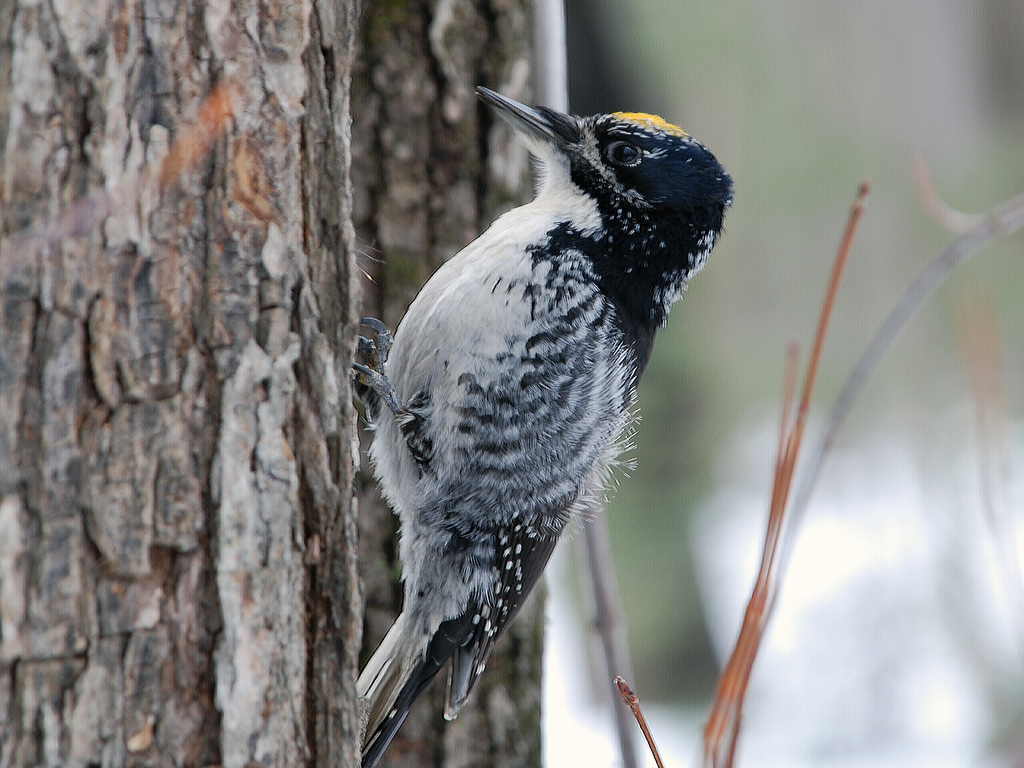
American three-toed woodpecker

Order: Piciformes Family: Picidae

Woodpeckers are small to medium-sized birds with chisel-like beaks, short legs, stiff tails, and long tongues used for capturing insects. Some species have feet with two toes pointing forward and two backward, while several species have only three toes. Many woodpeckers have the habit of tapping noisily on tree trunks with their beaks. Ten species have been recorded in Yellowstone.

Common name	Binomial	Status
Lewis's woodpecker	Melanerpes lewis	B R
Williamson's sapsucker	Sphyrapicus thyroideus	B U
Red-naped sapsucker	Sphyrapicus nuchalis	B U
American three-toed woodpecker	Picoides dorsalis	B U
Black-backed woodpecker	Picoides arcticus	B R
Downy woodpecker	Dryobates pubescens	B U
Hairy woodpecker	Dryobates villosus	B
Northern flicker	Colaptes auratus	B
Pileated woodpecker	Dryocopus pileatus	B R

== Falcons and caracaras ==
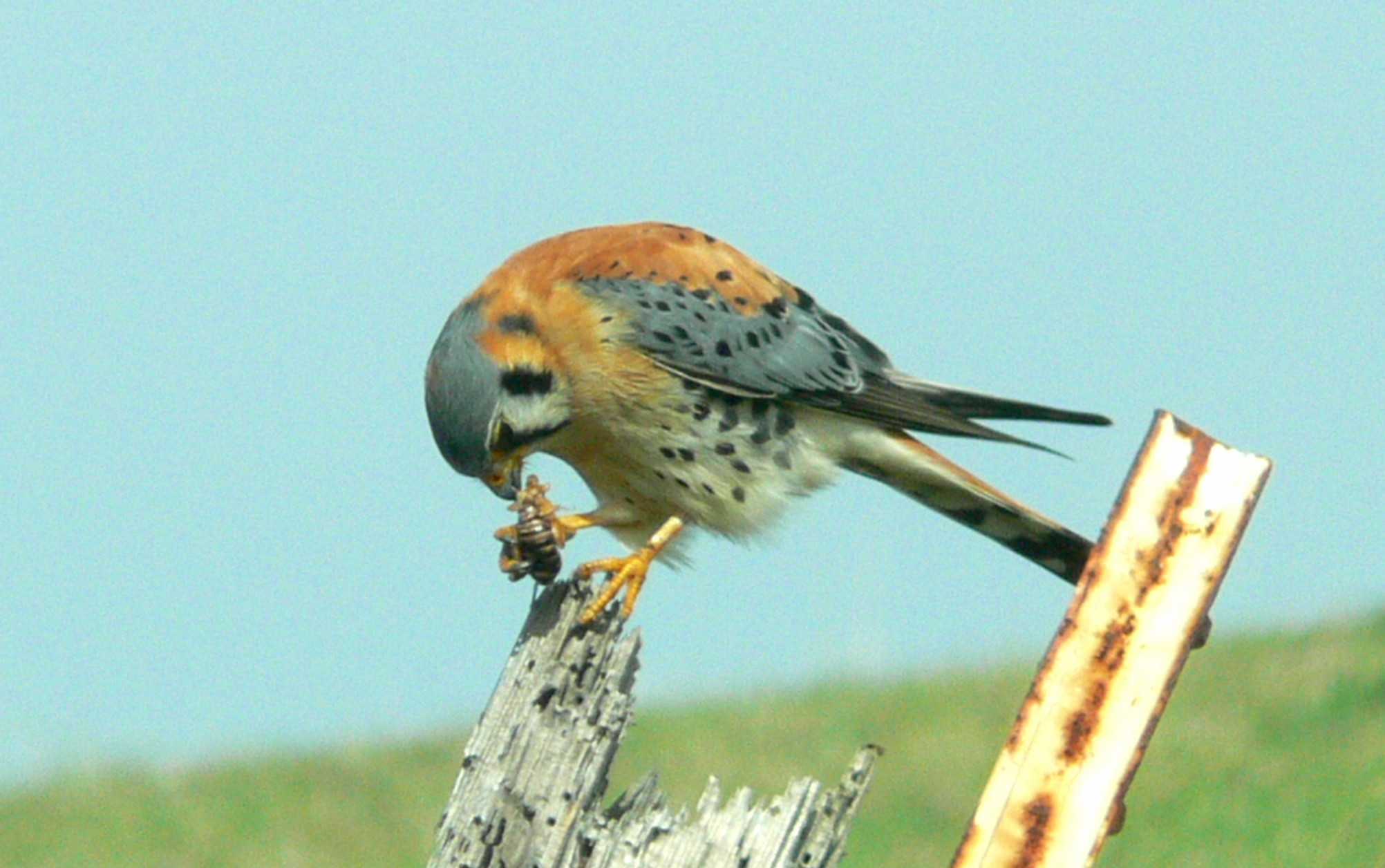
American kestrel

Order: Falconiformes Family: Falconidae

Falconidae is a family of diurnal birds of prey, notably the falcons and caracaras. They differ from hawks, eagles, and kites in that they kill with their beaks instead of their talons. Five species have been recorded in Yellowstone.

Common name	Binomial	Status
Crested caracara	Caracara plancus	V
American kestrel	Falco sparverius	B U
Merlin	Falco columbarius	R
Peregrine falcon	Falco peregrinus	B U
Prairie falcon	Falco mexicanus	B U

== Tyrant flycatchers ==
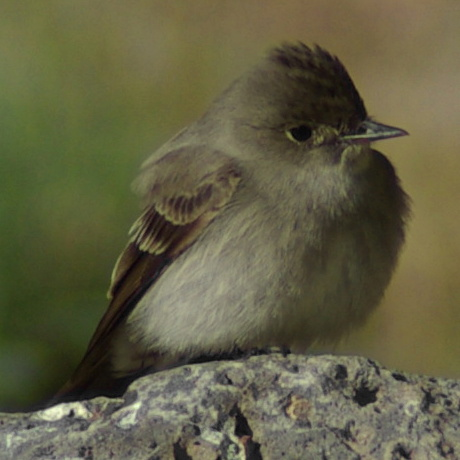
Western wood-pewee

Order: Passeriformes Family: Tyrannidae

Tyrant flycatchers are Passerine birds which occur throughout North and South America. They superficially resemble the Old World flycatchers, but are more robust and have stronger bills. They do not have the sophisticated vocal capabilities of the songbirds. Most, but not all, are rather plain. As the name implies, most are insectivorous. Twelve species have been recorded in Yellowstone.

Common name	Binomial	Status
Ash-throated flycatcher	Myiarchus cinerascens	V
Western kingbird	Tyrannus verticalis	R
Eastern kingbird	Tyrannus tyrannus	R
Scissor-tailed flycatcher	Tyrannus forficatus	V
Olive-sided flycatcher	Contopus cooperi	B
Western wood-pewee	Contopus sordidulus	B U
Willow flycatcher	Empidonax traillii	B U
Least flycatcher	Empidonax minimus	V
Hammond's flycatcher	Empidonax hammondii	B U
Dusky flycatcher	Empidonax oberholseri	B
Western flycatcher	Empidonax difficilis	B R
Say's phoebe	Sayornis saya	V

== Vireos, shrike-babblers, and erpornis ==
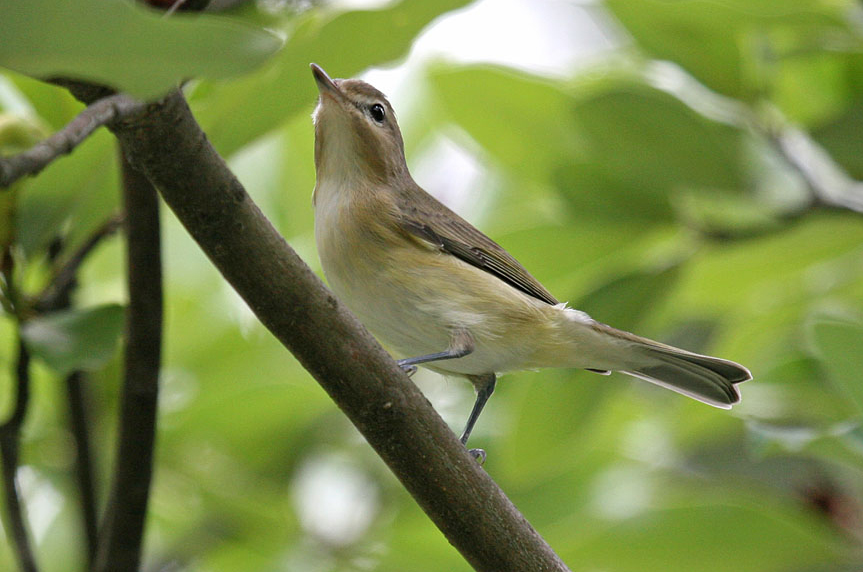
Warbling vireo

Order: Passeriformes Family: Vireonidae

The vireos are a group of small to medium-sized passerine birds restricted to the New World. They are typically greenish in color and resemble wood warblers apart from their heavier bills. Four species have been recorded in Yellowstone.

Common name	Binomial	Status
Cassin's vireo	Vireo cassinii	V
Plumbeous vireo	Vireo plumbeous	V
Warbling vireo	Vireo gilvus	B
Red-eyed vireo	Vireo olivaceus	V

== Shrikes ==
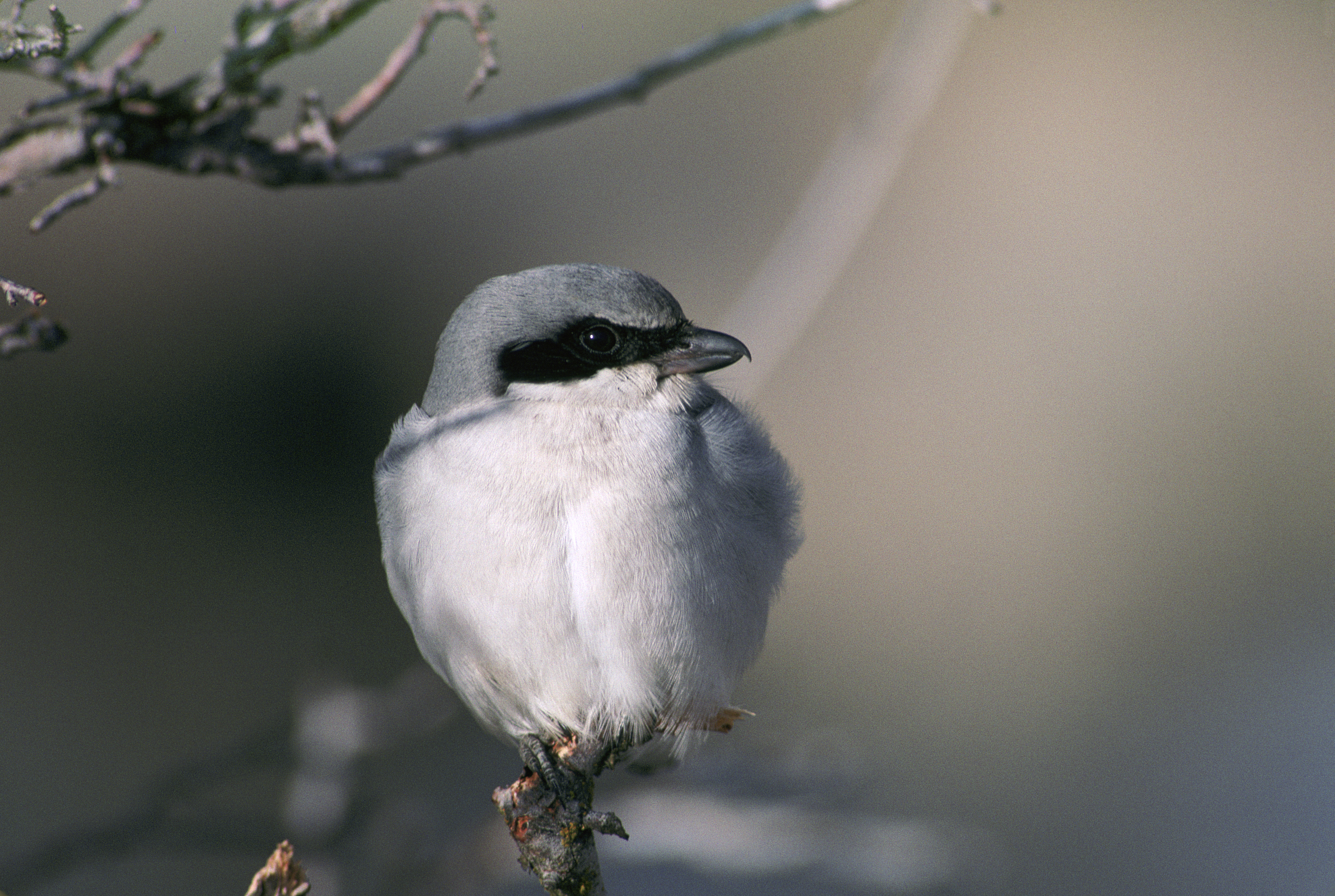
Loggerhead shrike

Order: Passeriformes Family: Laniidae

Shrikes are passerine birds known for their habit of catching other birds and small animals and impaling the uneaten portions of their bodies on thorns. A shrike's beak is hooked, like that of a typical bird of prey. Two species have been recorded in Yellowstone.

Common name	Binomial	Status
Loggerhead shrike	Lanius ludovicianus	R
Northern shrike	Lanius excubitor	U

== Crows, jays, and magpies ==
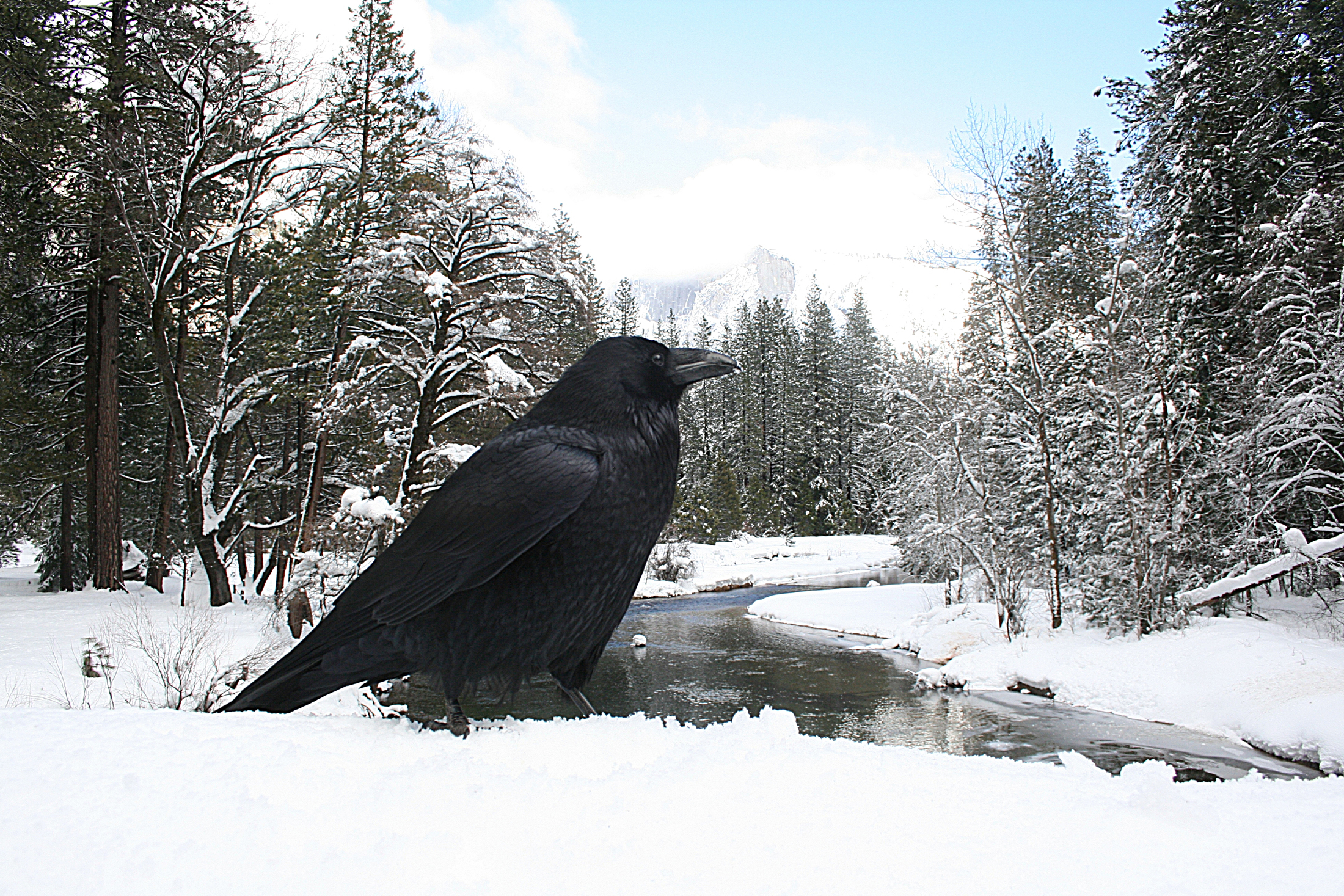
Common raven

Order: Passeriformes Family: Corvidae

The family Corvidae includes crows, ravens, jays, choughs, magpies, treepies, nutcrackers, and ground jays. Corvids are above average in size among the Passeriformes, and some of the larger species show high levels of intelligence. Eight species have been recorded in Yellowstone.

Common name	Binomial	Status
Canada jay	Perisoreus canadensis	B U
Pinyon jay	Gymnorhinus cyanocephalus	R
Steller's jay	Cyanocitta stelleri	B U
Blue jay	Cyanocitta cristata	R
Clark's nutcracker	Nucifraga columbiana	B
Black-billed magpie	Pica hudsonia	B
American crow	Corvus brachyrhynchos	B U
Common raven	Corvus corax	B

== Tits, chickadees, and titmice ==
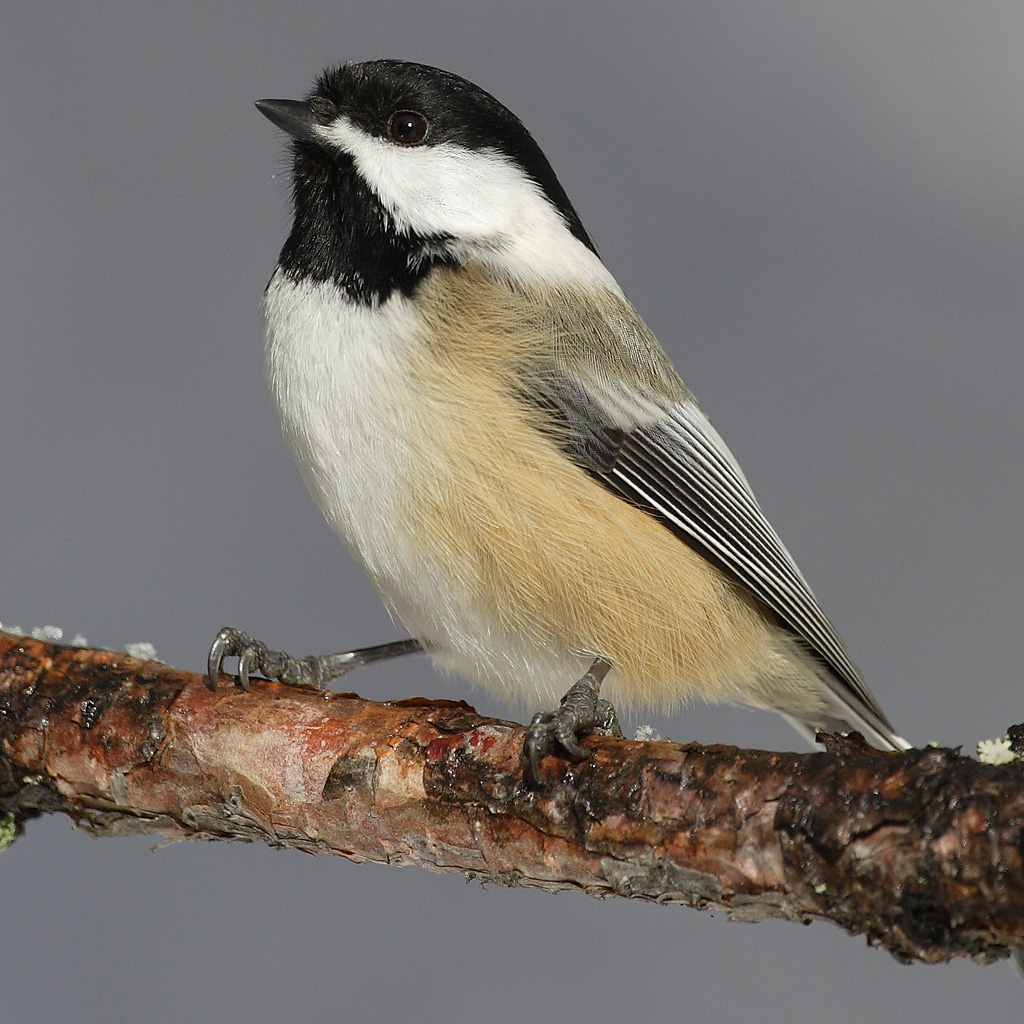
Black-capped chickadee

Order: Passeriformes Family: Paridae

The Paridae are mainly small stocky woodland species with short stout bills. Some have crests. They are adaptable birds, with a mixed diet including seeds and insects. Two species have been recorded in Yellowstone.

Common name	Binomial	Status
Black-capped chickadee	Poecile atricapilla	B U
Mountain chickadee	Poecile gambeli	B

== Larks ==
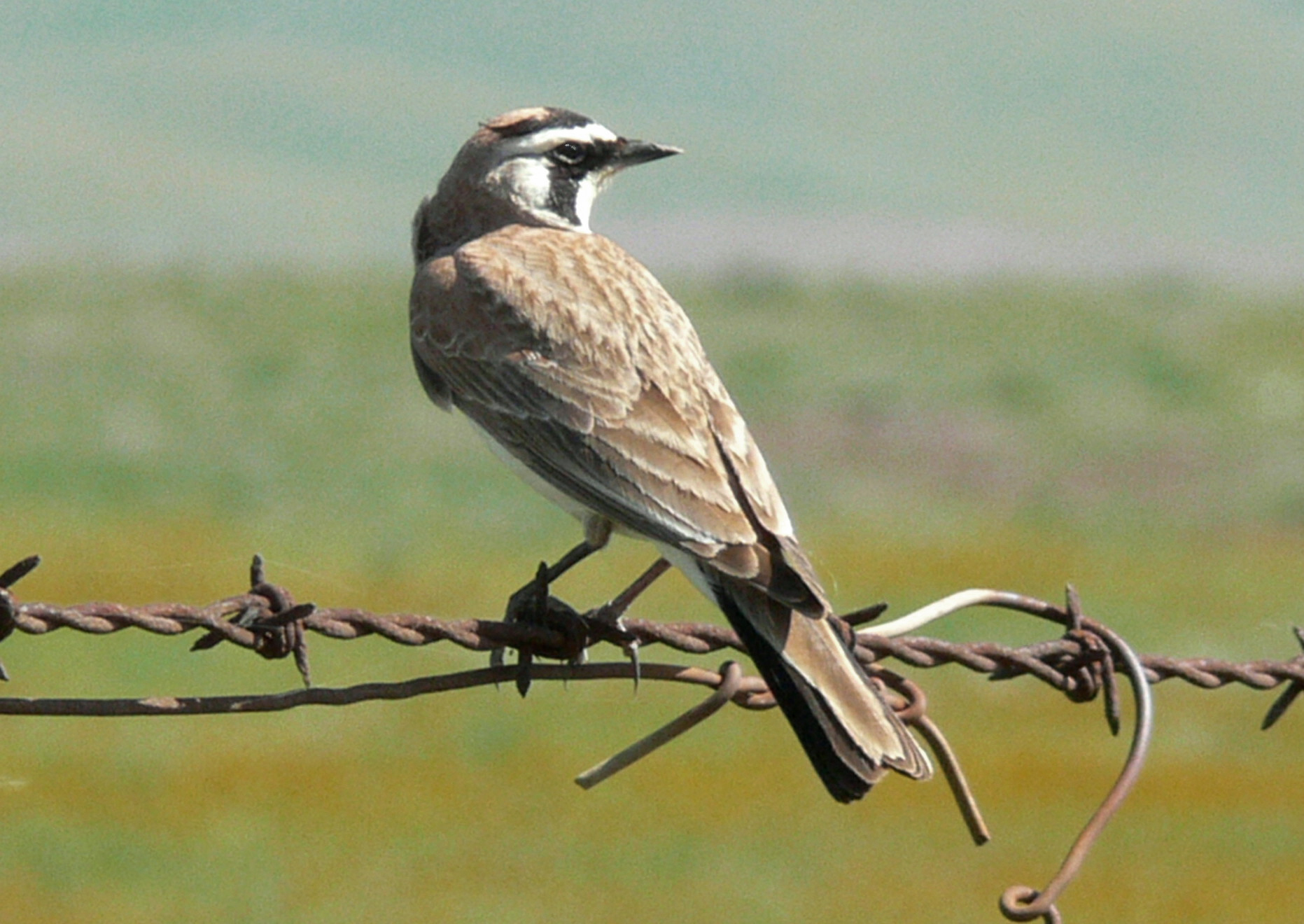
Horned lark

Order: Passeriformes Family: Alaudidae

Larks are small terrestrial birds with often extravagant songs and display flights. Most larks are fairly dull in appearance. Their food is insects and seeds. One species has been recorded in Yellowstone.

Common name	Binomial	Status
Horned lark	Eremophila alpestris	B U

== Swallows ==
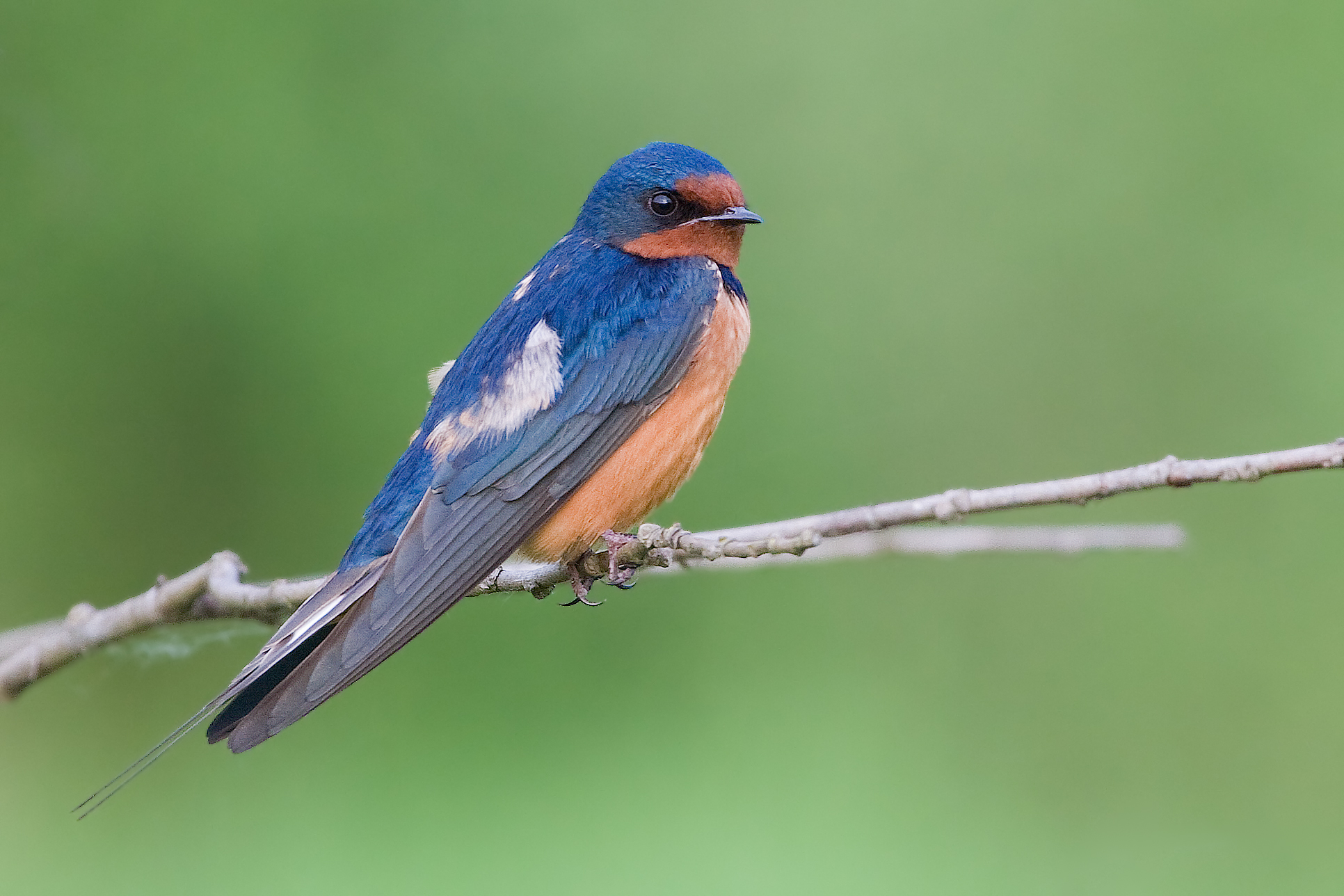
Barn swallow

Order: Passeriformes Family: Hirundinidae

The family Hirundinidae is adapted to aerial feeding. They have a slender streamlined body, long pointed wings, and a short bill with a wide gape. The feet are adapted to perching rather than walking, and the front toes are partially joined at the base. Seven species have been recorded in Yellowstone.

Common name	Binomial	Status
Bank swallow	Riparia riparia	B U
Tree swallow	Tachycineta bicolor	B
Violet-green swallow	Tachycineta thalassina	B
Northern rough-winged swallow	Stelgidopteryx serripennis	B U
Barn swallow	Hirundo rustica	B U
Cliff swallow	Petrochelidon pyrrhonota	B

== Kinglets ==
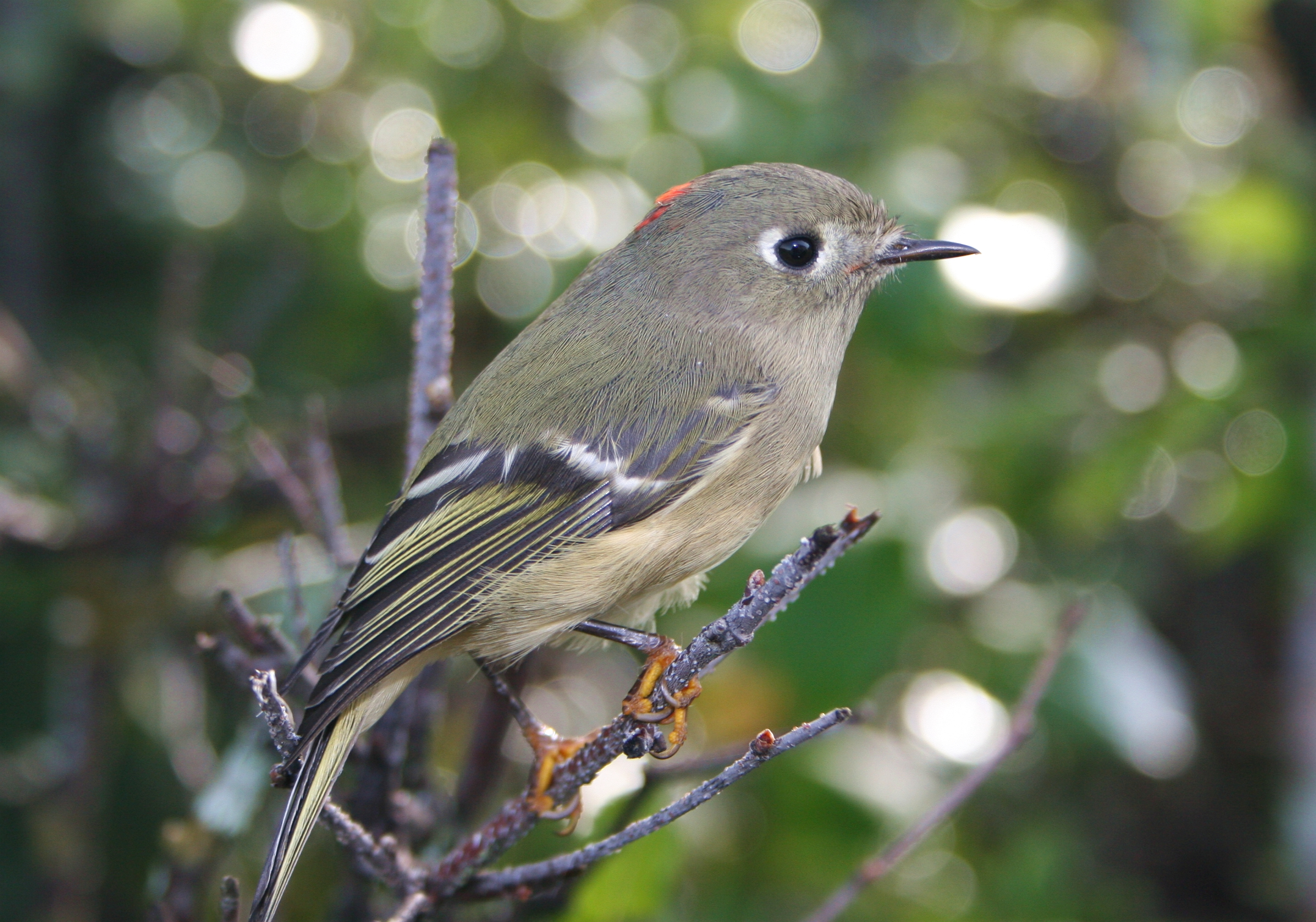
Ruby-crowned kinglet

Order: Passeriformes Family: Regulidae

The kinglets are a small family of birds which resemble the titmice. They are very small insectivorous birds, mostly in the genus Regulus. The adults have colored crowns, giving rise to their names. Two species have been recorded in Yellowstone.

Common name	Binomial	Status
Ruby-crowned kinglet	Corthylio calendula	B
Golden-crowned kinglet	Regulus satrapa	B U

== Waxwings ==
Order: Passeriformes Family: Bombycillidae

The waxwings are a group of passerine birds with soft silky plumage and unique red tips to some of the wing feathers. In the Bohemian and cedar waxwings, these tips look like sealing wax and give the group its name. These are arboreal birds of northern forests. They live on insects in summer and berries in winter. Two species have been recorded in Yellowstone.

Common name	Binomial	Status
Bohemian waxwing	Bombycilla garrulus	
Cedar waxwing	Bombycilla cedrorum	B U

== Nuthatches ==
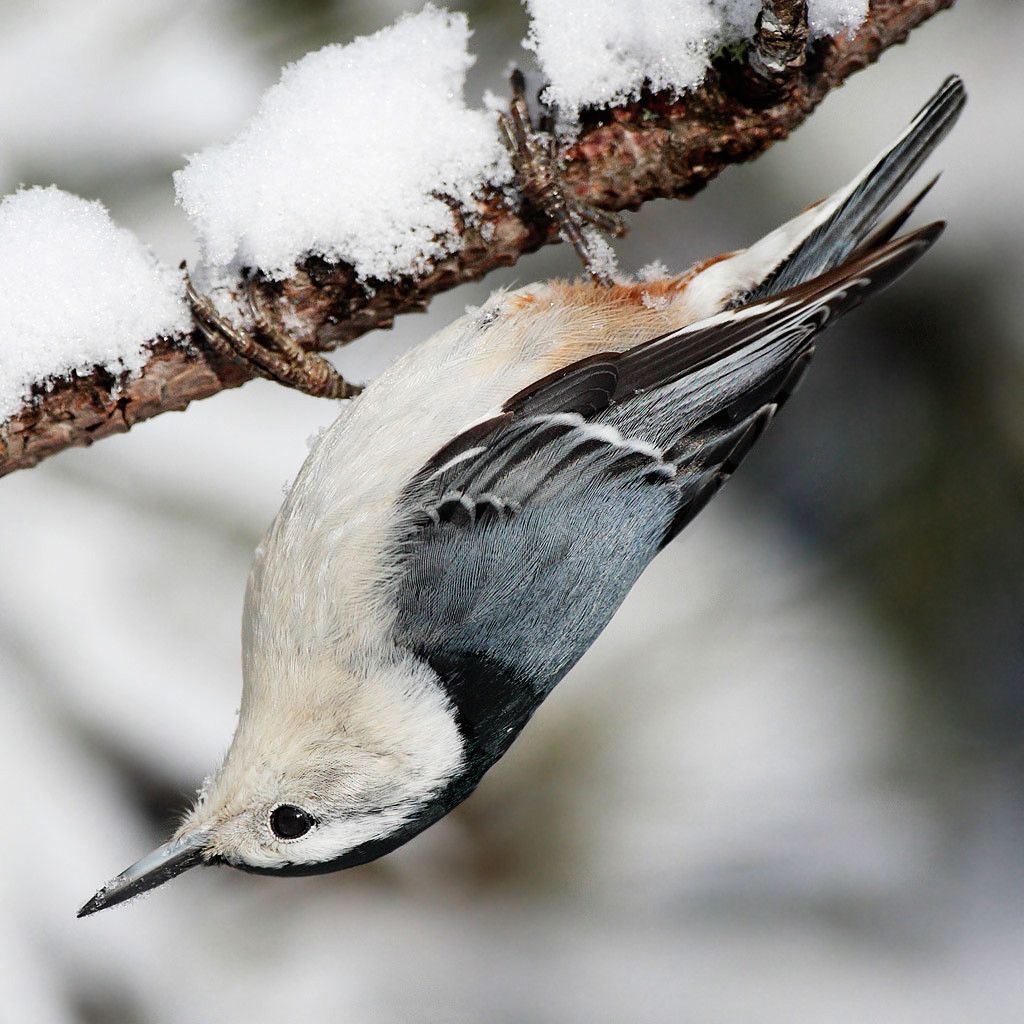
White-breasted nuthatch

Order: Passeriformes Family: Sittidae

Nuthatches are small woodland birds. They have the unusual ability to climb down trees head first, unlike other birds which can only go upwards. Nuthatches have big heads, short tails, and powerful bills and feet. Three species have been recorded in Yellowstone.

Common name	Binomial	Status
Red-breasted nuthatch	Sitta canadensis	B
White-breasted nuthatch	Sitta carolinensis	B U
Pygmy nuthatch	Sitta pygmaea	V

== Treecreepers ==
Order: Passeriformes Family: Certhiidae

Creepers are small woodland birds, brown above and white below. They have thin pointed down-curved bills, which they use to extricate insects from bark. They have stiff tail feathers, like woodpeckers, which they use to support themselves on vertical trees. One species has been recorded in Yellowstone.

Common name	Binomial	Status
Brown creeper	Certhia americana	B U

== Gnatcatchers ==
Order: Passeriformes Family: Polioptilidae

These dainty birds resemble Old World warblers in their structure and habits, moving restlessly through the foliage seeking insects. The gnatcatchers are mainly soft bluish gray in color and have the typical insectivore's long sharp bill. Many species have distinctive black head patterns (especially males) and long, regularly cocked, black-and-white tails. One species has been recorded in Yellowstone.

Common name	Binomial	Status
Blue-gray gnatcatcher	Polioptila caerulea	V

== Wrens ==
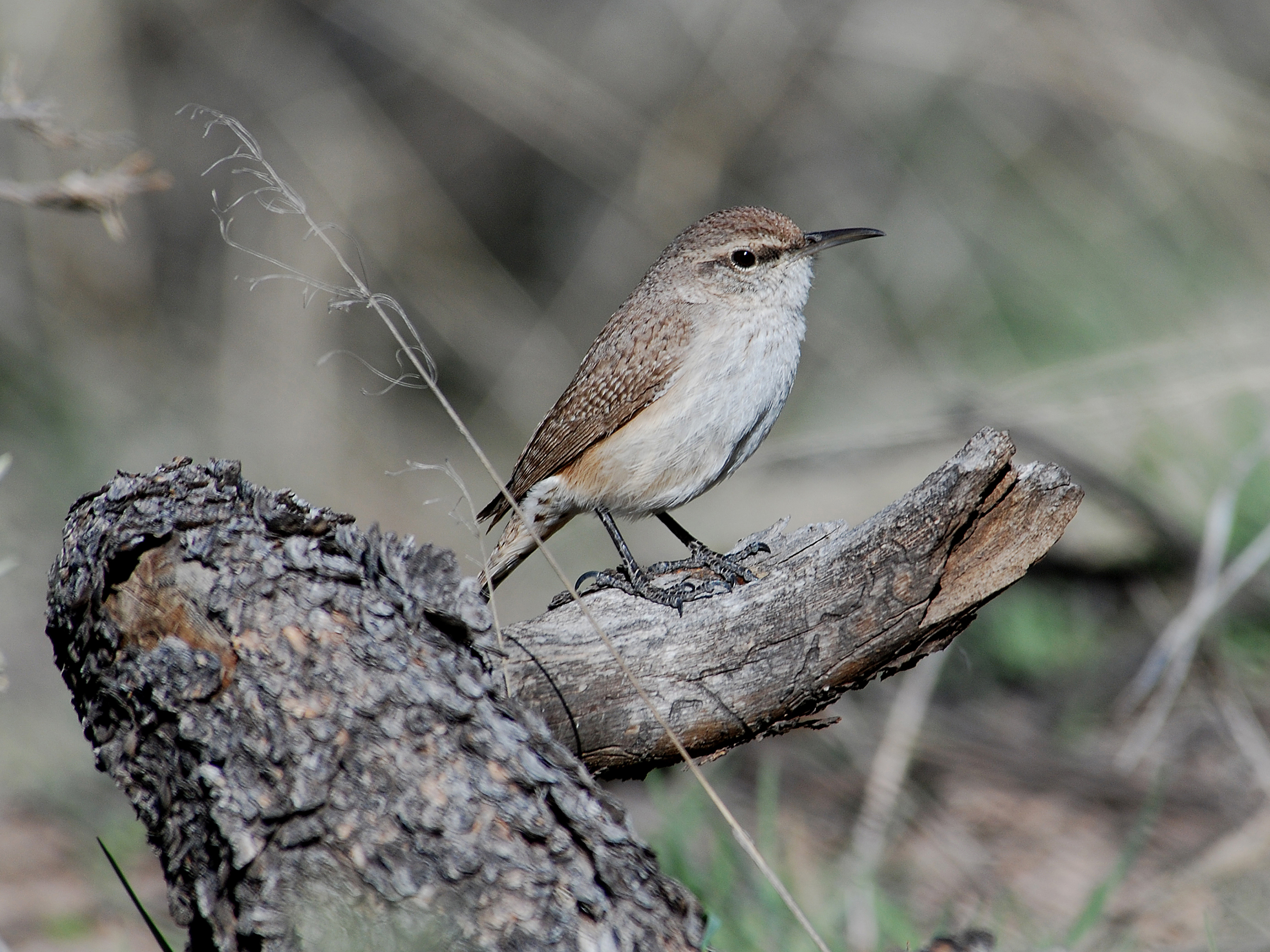
Rock wren

Order: Passeriformes Family: Troglodytidae

Wrens are small and inconspicuous birds, except for their loud songs. They have short wings and thin down-turned bills. Several species often hold their tails upright. All are insectivorous. Six species have been recorded in Yellowstone.

Common name	Binomial	Status
Rock wren	Salpinctes obsoletus	B U
Canyon wren	Catherpes mexicanus	V
Northern house wren	Troglodytes aedon	B
Marsh wren	Cistothorus palustris	B R

== Mockingbirds and thrashers ==
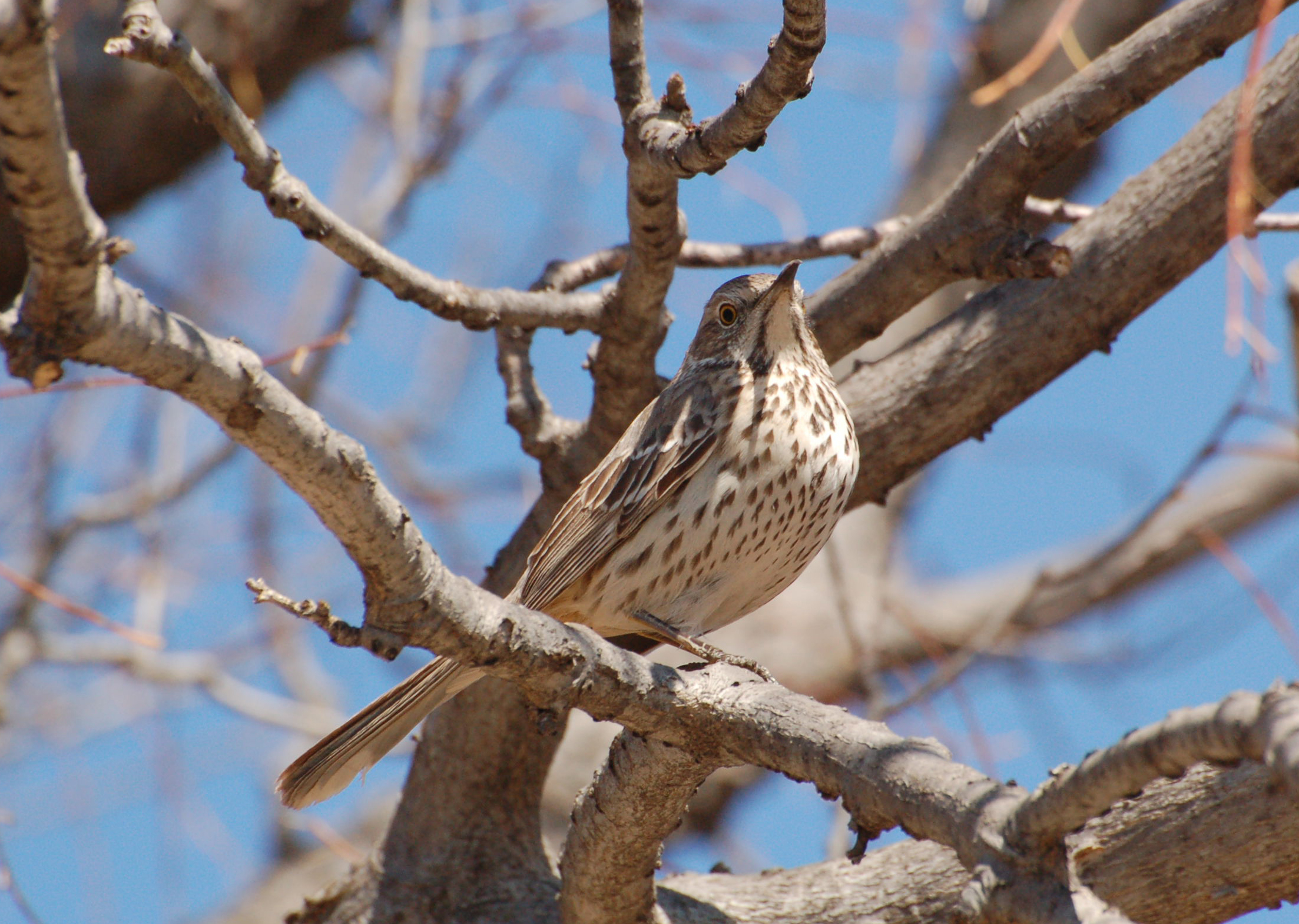
Sage thrasher

Order: Passeriformes Family: Mimidae

The mimids are a family of passerine birds which includes thrashers, mockingbirds, tremblers, and the New World catbirds. These birds are notable for their vocalization, especially their remarkable ability to mimic a wide variety of birds and other sounds heard outdoors. The species tend towards dull grays and browns in their appearance. Two species have been recorded in Yellowstone.

Common name	Binomial	Status
Gray catbird	Dumetella carolinensis	B U
Sage thrasher	Oreoscoptes montanus	B U

== Starlings ==
Order: Passeriformes Family: Sturnidae

Starlings are small to medium-sized passerines with strong feet. Their flight is strong and direct and they are very gregarious. Their preferred habitat is fairly open country, and they eat insects and fruit. Plumage is typically dark with a metallic sheen. One species has been recorded in Yellowstone.

Common name	Binomial	Status
European starling	Sturnus vulgaris	I B U

== Dippers ==
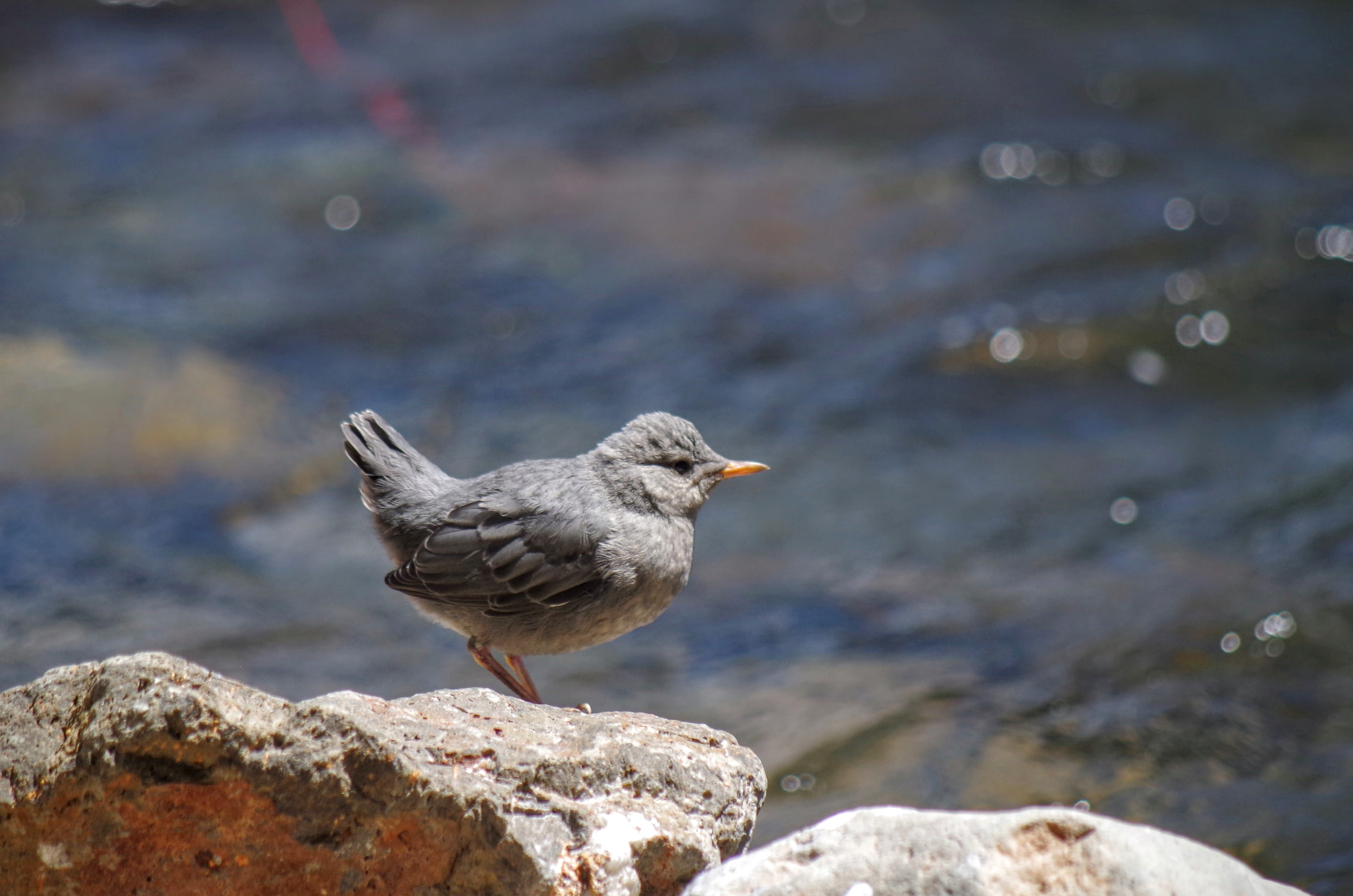
American dipper in Yellowstone National Park

Order: Passeriformes Family: Cinclidae

Dippers are small stout birds that feed in cold, fast-moving streams. One species has been recorded in Yellowstone.

Common name	Binomial	Status
American dipper	Cinclus mexicanus	B U

== Thrushes and allies ==
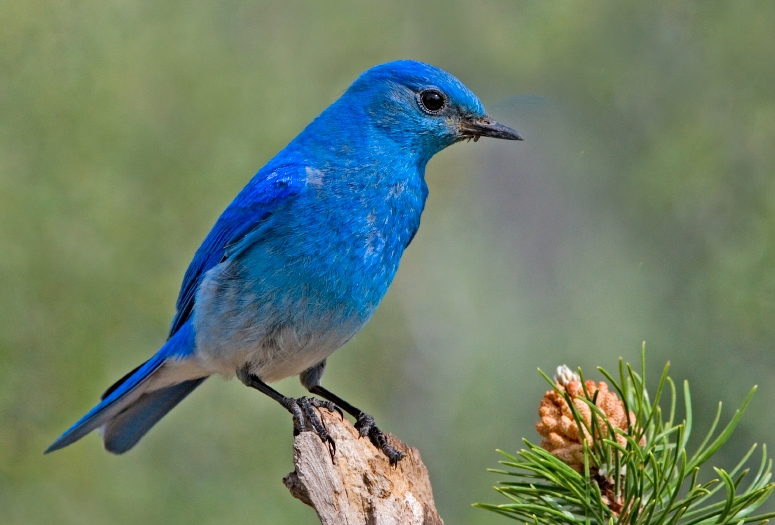
Mountain bluebird

Order: Passeriformes Family: Turdidae

The thrushes are a group of passerine birds that occur mainly but not exclusively in the Old World. They are plump, soft plumaged, small to medium-sized insectivores or sometimes omnivores, often feeding on the ground. Many have attractive songs. Eight species have been recorded in Yellowstone.

Common name	Binomial	Status
Western bluebird	Sialia mexicana	R
Mountain bluebird	Sialia currucoides	B
Townsend's solitaire	Myadestes townsendi	B
Veery	Catharus fuscescens	V
Swainson's thrush	Catharus ustulatus	B U
Hermit thrush	Catharus guttatus	B
American robin	Turdus migratorius	B
Varied thrush	Ixoreus naevius	V

== Old World sparrows ==
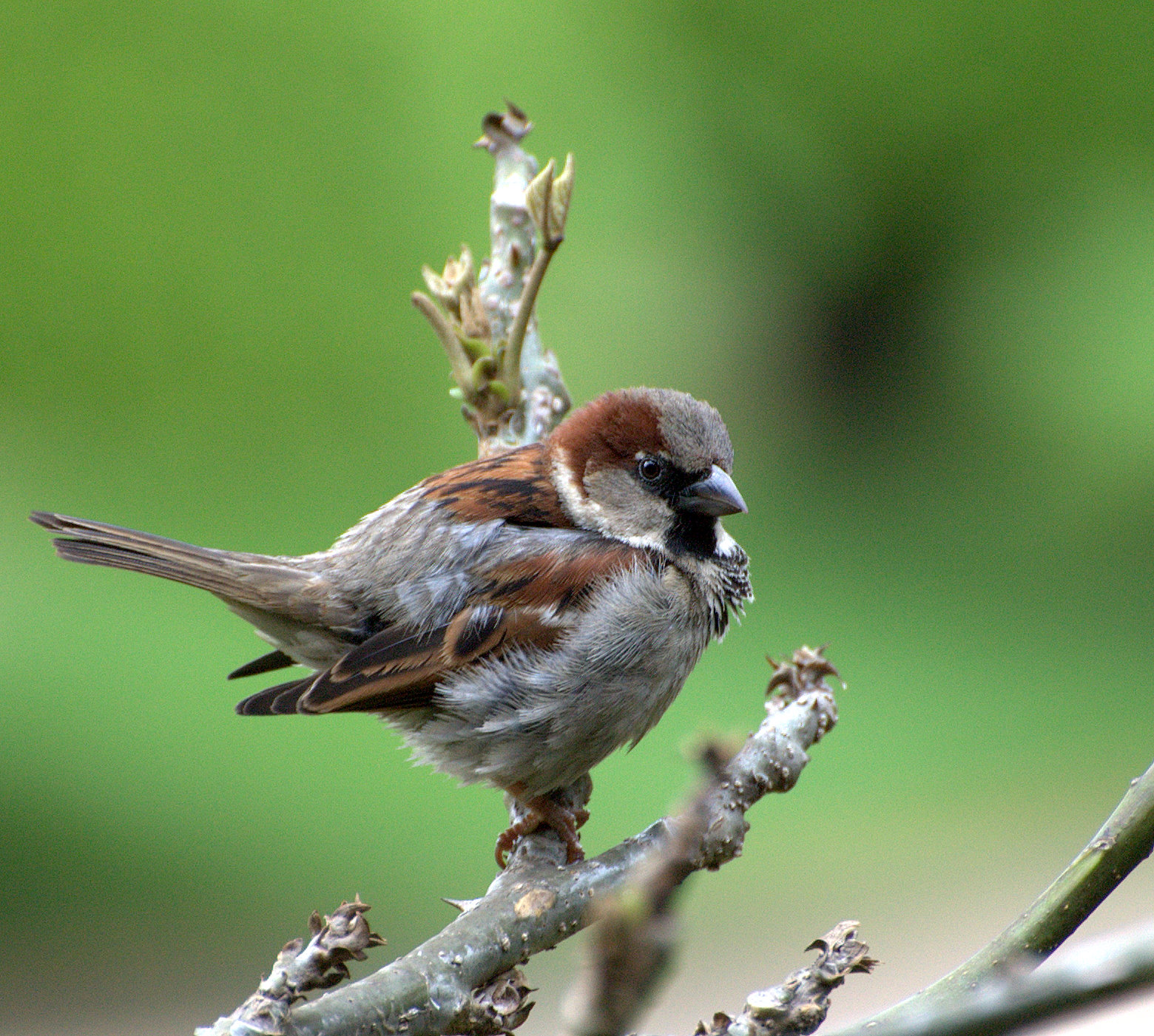
House sparrow

Order: Passeriformes Family: Passeridae

In general, Old World sparrows tend to be small plump brownish or grayish birds with short tails and short powerful beaks. Sparrows are seed eaters, but they also consume small insects. One species has been recorded in Yellowstone.

Common name	Binomial	Status
House sparrow	Passer domesticus	I B

== Wagtails and pipits ==
Order: Passeriformes Family: Motacillidae

Motacillidae is a family of small passerine birds with medium to long tails which includes the wagtails, longclaws, and pipits. They are slender ground-feeding insectivores of open country. One species has been recorded in Yellowstone.

Common name	Binomial	Status
American pipit	Anthus rubescens	B R

== Finches, euphonias, and allies ==
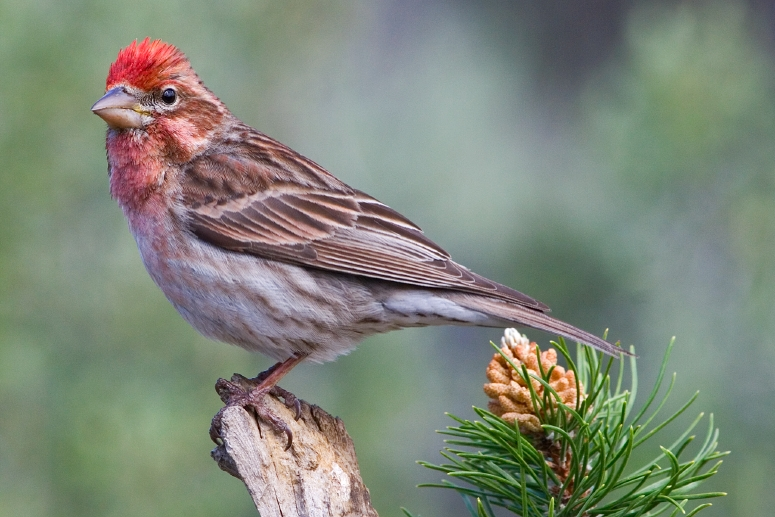
Cassin's finch

Order: Passeriformes Family: Fringillidae

Finches are seed-eating passerine birds that are small to moderately large and have a strong beak, usually conical and in some species very large. All have twelve tail feathers and nine primaries. These birds have a bouncing flight with alternating bouts of flapping and gliding on closed wings, and most sing well. Twelve species have been recorded in Yellowstone.

Common name	Binomial	Status
Evening grosbeak	Coccothraustes vespertinus	B O
Pine grosbeak	Pinicola enucleator	B U
Gray-crowned rosy-finch	Leucosticte tephrocotis	R
Black rosy-finch	Leucosticte atrata	B U
House finch	Haemorhous mexicanus	R
Cassin's finch	Haemorhous cassinii	B
Redpoll	Acanthis flammea	U
Red crossbill	Loxia curvirostra	B U
White-winged crossbill	Loxia leucoptera	b R
Pine siskin	Spinus pinus	B
Lesser goldfinch	Spinus psaltria	V
American goldfinch	Spinus tristis	B R

== Longspurs and snow buntings ==
Order: Passeriformes Family: Calcariidae

The Calcariidae are a group of passerine birds that were traditionally grouped with the New World sparrows, but differ in a number of respects and are usually found in open grassy areas. Three species have been recorded in Yellowstone.

Common name	Binomial	Status
Thick-billed longspur	Rhynchophanes mccownii	V
Lapland longspur	Calcarius lapponicus	V
Snow bunting	Plectrophenax nivalis	O

== New World sparrows ==
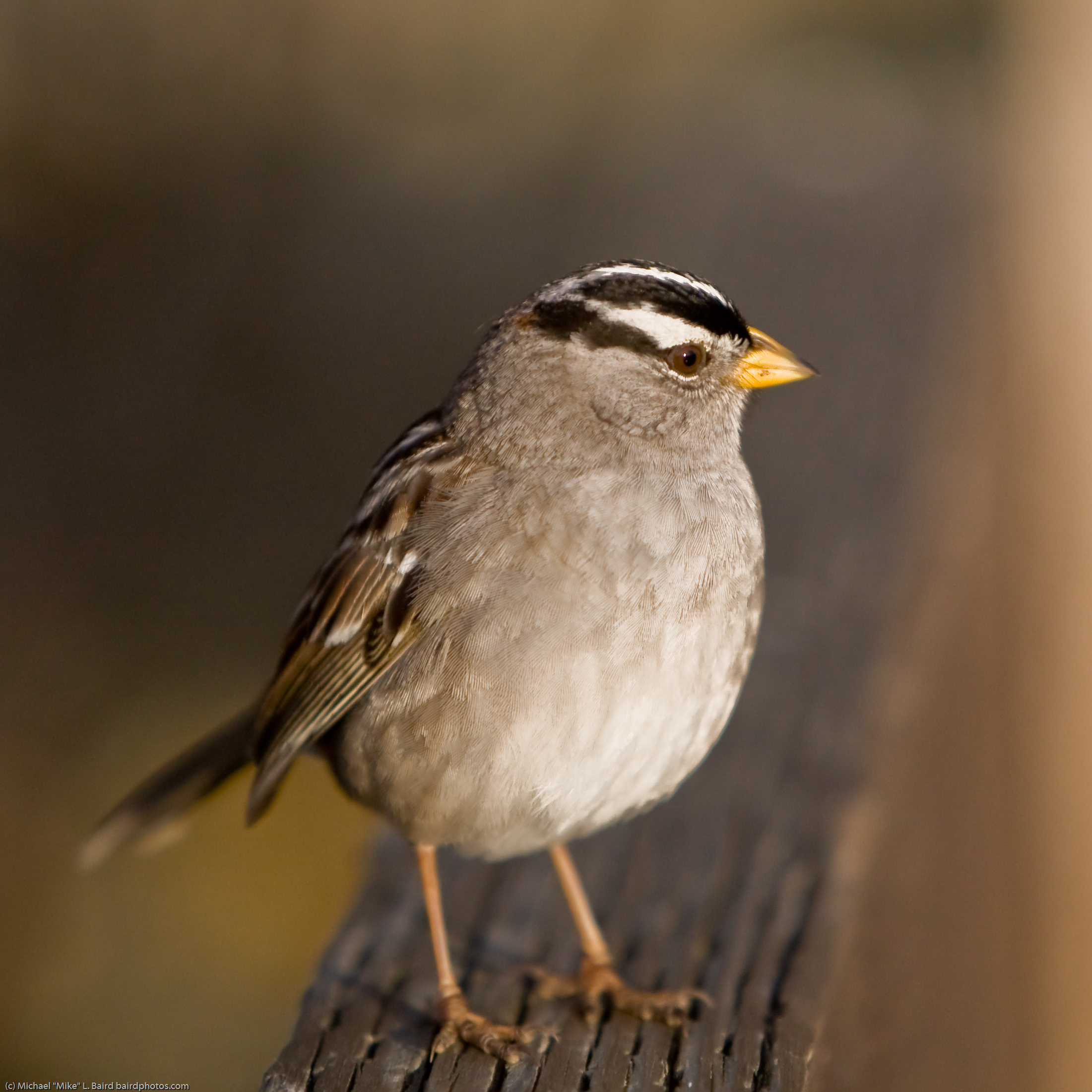
White-crowned sparrow

Order: Passeriformes Family: Passerellidae

Until 2017, these species were considered part of the family Emberizidae. Most of the species are known as sparrows, but these birds are not closely related to the Old World sparrows which are in the family Passeridae. Many of these have distinctive head patterns. Twenty-two species have been recorded in Yellowstone.

Common name	Binomial	Status
Grasshopper sparrow	Ammodramus savannarum	O
Black-throated sparrow	Amphispiza bilineata	V
Lark sparrow	Chondestes grammacus	O
Lark bunting	Calamospiza melanocorys	V
Chipping sparrow	Spizella passerina	B
Clay-colored sparrow	Spizella pallida	V
Brewer's sparrow	Spizella breweri	B
Fox sparrow	Passerella iliaca	B R
American tree sparrow	Spizelloides arborea	U
Dark-eyed junco	Junco hyemalis	B
White-crowned sparrow	Zonotrichia leucophrys	B
Harris's sparrow	Zonotrichia querula	V
White-throated sparrow	Zonotrichia albicollis	V
Sagebrush sparrow	Artemisiospiza nevadensis	V
Vesper sparrow	Pooecetes gramineus	B
Savannah sparrow	Passerculus sandwichensis	B
Song sparrow	Melospiza melodia	B
Lincoln's sparrow	Melospiza lincolnii	B
Swamp sparrow	Melospiza georgiana	V
Green-tailed towhee	Pipilo chlorurus	B U
Spotted towhee	Pipilo maculatus	B R

== Yellow-breasted chat ==
Order: Passeriformes Family: Icteriidae

This species was historically placed in the wood-warblers (Parulidae) but nonetheless most authorities were unsure if it belonged there. It was placed in its own family in 2017.

Common name	Binomial	Status
Yellow-breasted chat	Icteria virens	V

== Troupials and allies ==
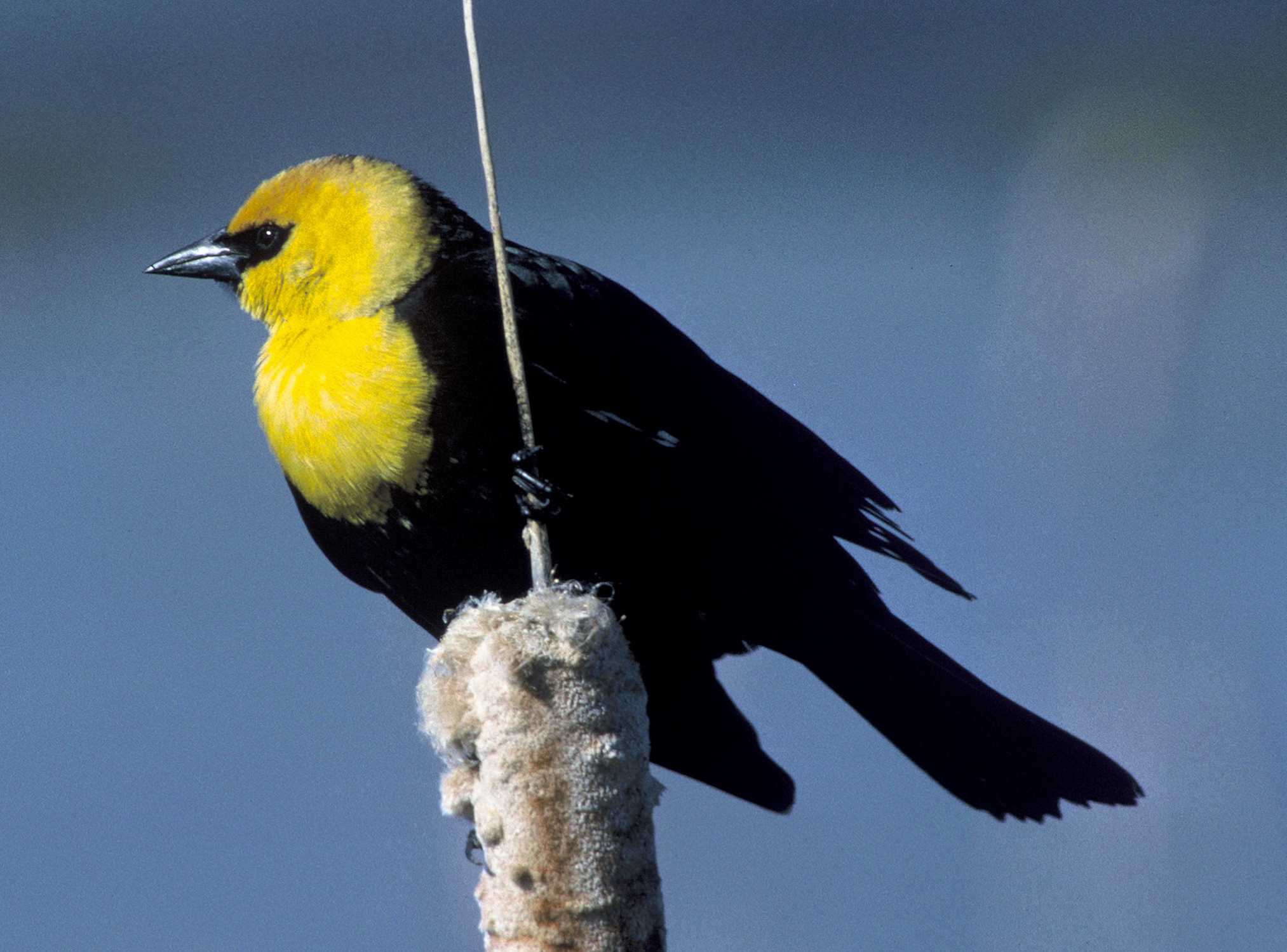
Yellow-headed blackbird

Order: Passeriformes Family: Icteridae

The icterids are a group of small to medium-sized, often colorful passerine birds restricted to the New World and include the grackles, New World blackbirds and New World orioles. Most species have black as a predominant plumage color, often enlivened by yellow, orange, or red. Nine species have been recorded in Yellowstone.

Common name	Binomial	Status
Yellow-headed blackbird	Xanthocephalus xanthocephalus	B
Bobolink	Dolichonyx oryzivorus	V
Western meadowlark	Sturnella neglecta	B
Bullock's oriole	Icterus bullockii	B R
Red-winged blackbird	Agelaius phoeniceus	B
Brown-headed cowbird	Molothrus ater	B
Rusty blackbird	Euphagus carolinus	V
Brewer's blackbird	Euphagus cyanocephalus	B
Common grackle	Quiscalus quiscula	V

== New World warblers ==
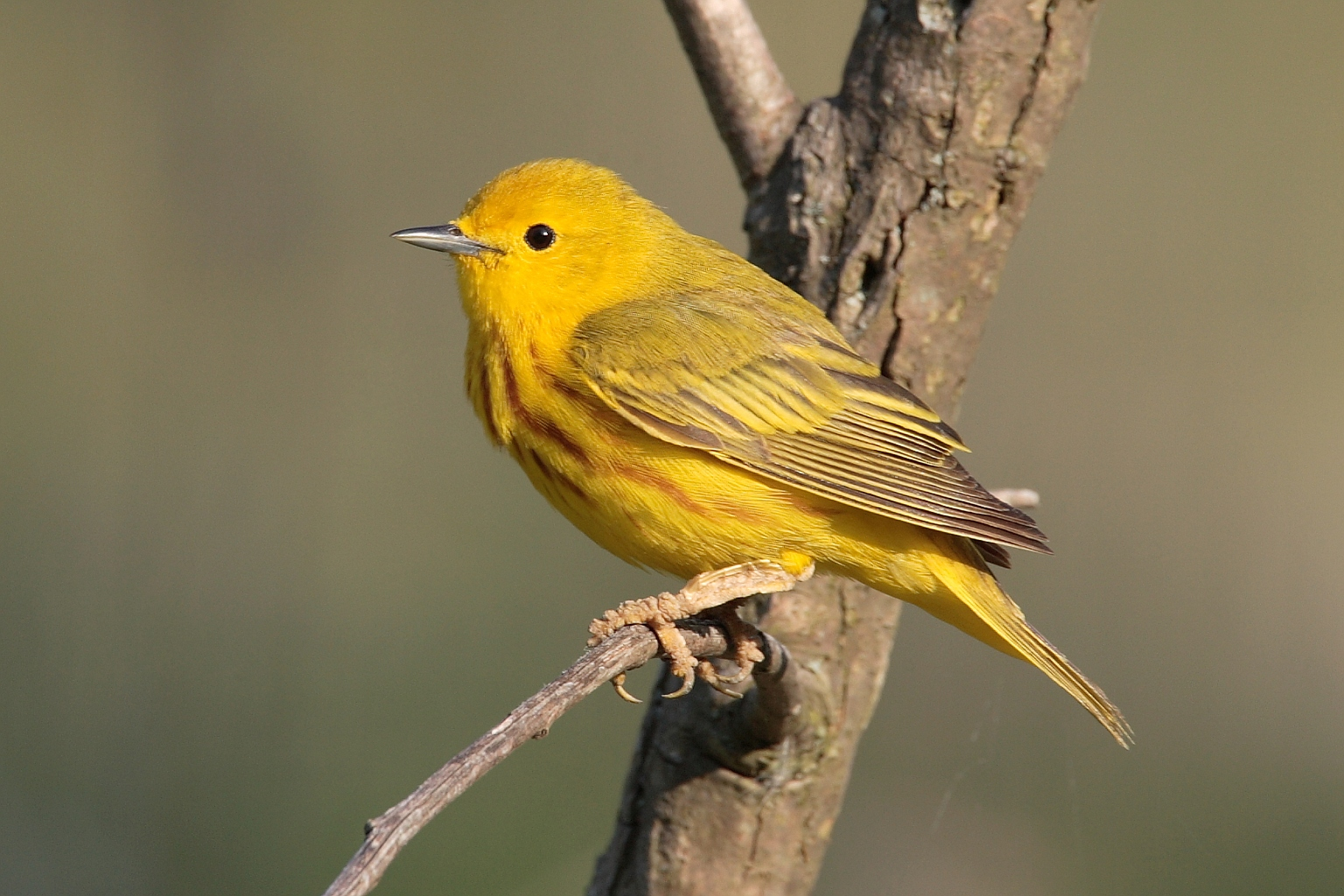
Yellow warbler

Order: Passeriformes Family: Parulidae

The wood warblers are a group of small often colorful passerine birds restricted to the New World. Most are arboreal, but some like the ovenbird and the two waterthrushes, are more terrestrial. Most members of this family are insectivores. Twenty-one species have been recorded in Yellowstone.

Common name	Binomial	Status
Ovenbird	Seiurus aurocapilla	V
Northern waterthrush	Parkesia noveboracensis	b R
Black-and-white warbler	Mniotilta varia	R
Prothonotary warbler	Protonotaria citrea	V
Tennessee warbler	Leiothlypis peregrina	R
Orange-crowned warbler	Leiothlypis celata	B U
Nashville warbler	Leiothlypis ruficapilla	R
MacGillivray's warbler	Geothlypis tolmiei	B U
Common yellowthroat	Geothlypis trichas	B
Hooded warbler	Setophaga citrina	V
American redstart	Setophaga ruticilla	B R
Cape May warbler	Setophaga tigrina	V
Blackburnian warbler	Setophaga fusca	R
Yellow warbler	Setophaga petechia	B
Chestnut-sided warbler	Setophaga pensylvanica	V
Blackpoll warbler	Setophaga striata	R
Yellow-rumped warbler	Setophaga coronata	B
Black-throated gray warbler	Setophaga nigrescens	V
Townsend's warbler	Setophaga townsendi	R
Wilson's warbler	Cardellina pusilla	B U

== Cardinals and allies ==
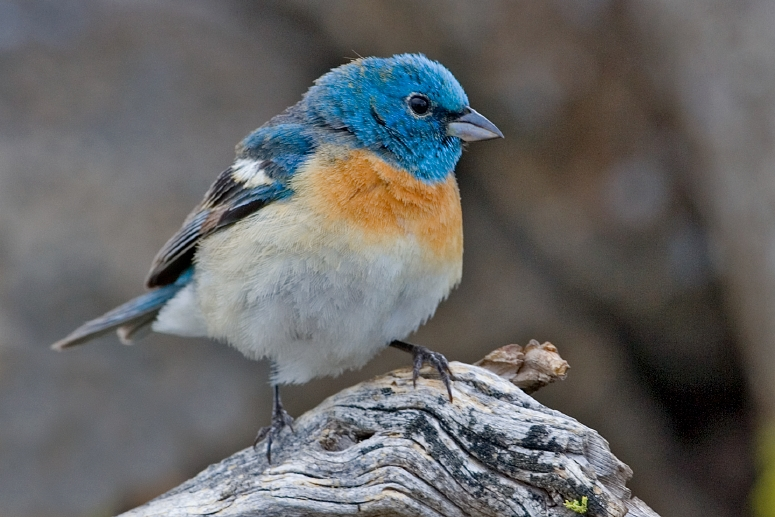
Lazuli bunting

Order: Passeriformes Family: Cardinalidae

The cardinals are a family of robust, seed-eating birds with strong bills. They are typically associated with open woodland. The sexes usually have distinct plumages. Five species have been recorded in Yellowstone.

Common name	Binomial	Status
Western tanager	Piranga ludoviciana	B
Rose-breasted grosbeak	Pheucticus ludovicianus	V
Black-headed grosbeak	Pheucticus melanocephalus	b R
Lazuli bunting	Passerina amoena	B

== See also ==
- List of birds of Idaho
- List of birds of Montana
- List of birds of Wyoming
