= List of birds of Wyoming =

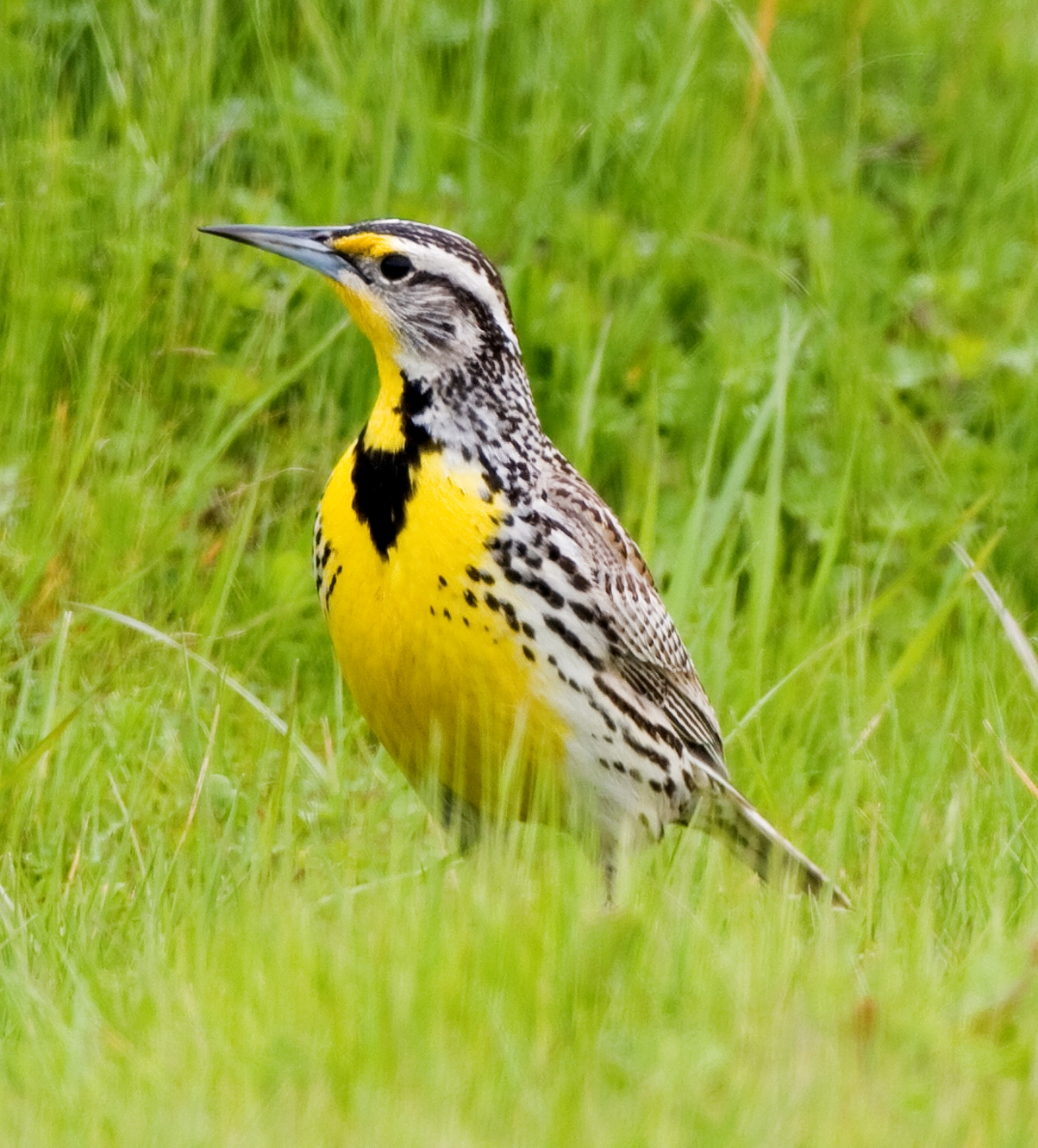
The western meadowlark is the state bird of Wyoming.

This list of birds of Wyoming includes species documented in the U.S. state of Wyoming by the Wyoming Game and Fish Department (WGFD) as of May 2021 with some additions from Avibase. The list contains 452 species. Of them, 118 are classed as accidental, and seven species have been introduced to North America. An additional accidental species has been added from another source.

This list is presented in the taxonomic sequence of the Check-list of North and Middle American Birds, 7th edition through the 62nd Supplement, published by the American Ornithological Society (AOS). Common and scientific names are also those of the Check-list, except that the common names of families are from the Clements taxonomy because the AOS list does not include them.

Unless otherwise noted, all species listed below are considered to occur regularly in Wyoming as permanent residents, summer or winter visitors, or migrants. These tags are used to annotate some species:

- (A) Accidental - "species with accidental, unpredictable, occurrence" per WGFD
- (I) Introduced - a species established in North America as a result of human action

== Ducks, geese, and waterfowl ==
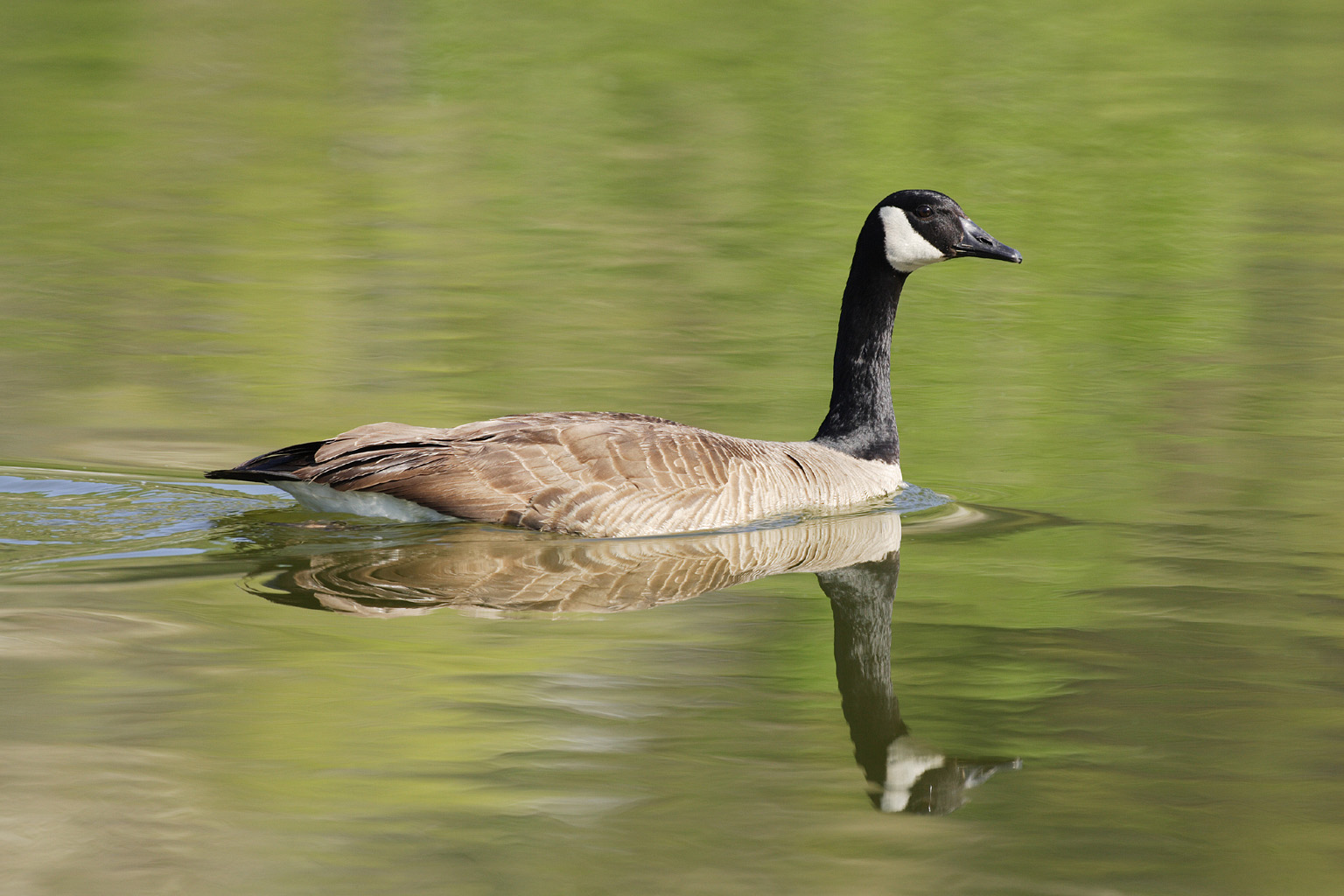
Canada goose

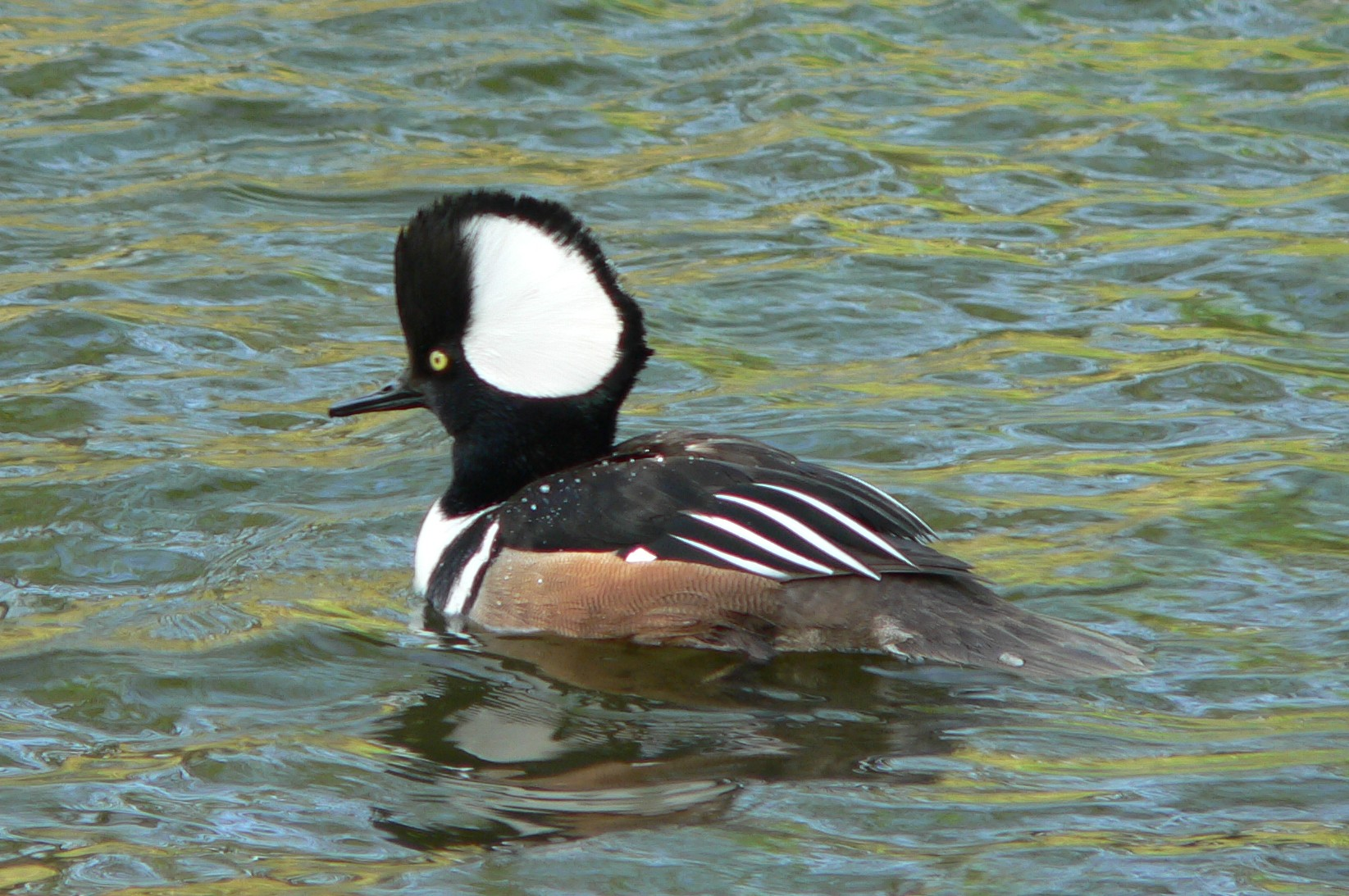
Hooded merganser

Order: Anseriformes Family: Anatidae

The family Anatidae includes the ducks and most duck-like waterfowl, such as geese and swans. These birds are adapted to an aquatic existence with webbed feet, bills which are flattened to a greater or lesser extent, and feathers that are excellent at shedding water due to special oils. Forty-one species have been recorded in Wyoming.

- Snow goose, Anser caerulescens
- Ross's goose, Anser rossii
- Greater white-fronted goose, Anser albifrons
- Brant, Branta bernicla (A)
- Cackling goose, Branta hutchinsii (A)
- Canada goose, Branta canadensis
- Trumpeter swan, Cygnus buccinator
- Tundra swan, Cygnus columbianus
- Whooper swan, Cygnus cygnus (A)
- Wood duck, Aix sponsa
- Garganey, Spatula querquedula (A)
- Blue-winged teal, Spatula discors
- Cinnamon teal, Spatula cyanoptera
- Northern shoveler, Spatula clypeata
- Gadwall, Mareca strepera
- Eurasian wigeon, Mareca penelope (A)
- American wigeon, Mareca americana
- Mallard, Anas platyrhynchos
- Mexican duck, Anas diazi (A)
- American black duck, Anas rubripes (A)
- Mottled duck, Anas fulvigula (A)
- Northern pintail, Anas acuta
- Green-winged teal, Anas crecca
- Canvasback, Aythya valisineria
- Redhead, Aythya americana
- Ring-necked duck, Aythya collaris
- Tufted duck, Aythya fuligula (A)
- Greater scaup, Aythya marila
- Lesser scaup, Aythya affinis
- Harlequin duck, Histrionicus histrionicus
- Surf scoter, Melanitta perspicillata
- White-winged scoter, Melanitta deglandi
- Black scoter, Melanitta americana (A)
- Long-tailed duck, Clangula hyemalis
- Bufflehead, Bucephala albeola
- Common goldeneye, Bucephala clangula
- Barrow's goldeneye, Bucephala islandica
- Hooded merganser, Lophodytes cucullatus
- Common merganser, Mergus merganser
- Red-breasted merganser, Mergus serrator
- Ruddy duck, Oxyura jamaicensis

== New World quail ==
Order: Galliformes Family: Odontophoridae

The New World quails are small, plump terrestrial birds only distantly related to the quails of the Old World, but named for their similar appearance and habits. One species has been recorded in Wyoming.

- Northern bobwhite, Colinus virginianus
- California quail, Callipepla californica (A)

== Pheasants, grouse, and allies ==
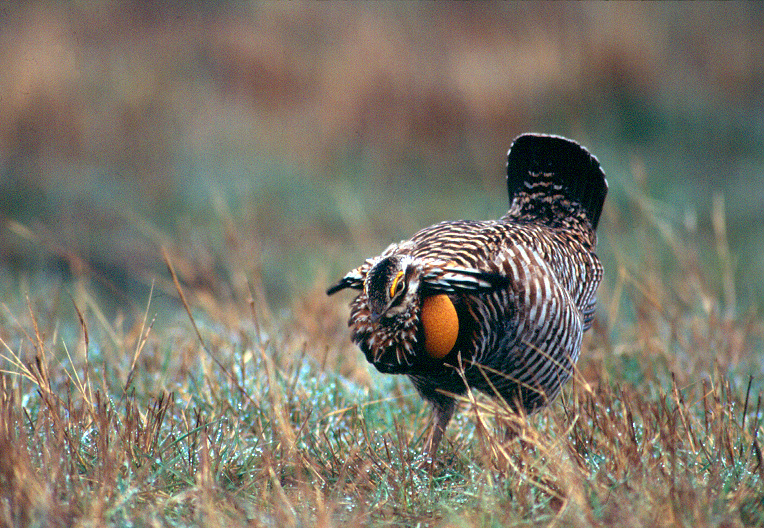
Greater prairie-chicken

Order: Galliformes Family: Phasianidae

Phasianidae consists of the pheasants and their allies. These are terrestrial species, variable in size but generally plump with broad relatively short wings. Many species are gamebirds or have been domesticated as a food source for humans. Ten species have been recorded in Wyoming.

- Wild turkey, Meleagris gallopavo
- Ruffed grouse, Bonasa umbellus
- Greater sage-grouse, Centrocercus urophasianus
- White-tailed ptarmigan, Lagopus leucurus
- Dusky grouse, Dendragapus obscurus
- Sharp-tailed grouse, Tympanuchus phasianellus
- Greater prairie-chicken, Tympanuchus cupido (A)
- Gray partridge, Perdix perdix (I)
- Ring-necked pheasant, Phasianus colchicus (I)
- Chukar, Alectoris chukar (I)

== Grebes ==
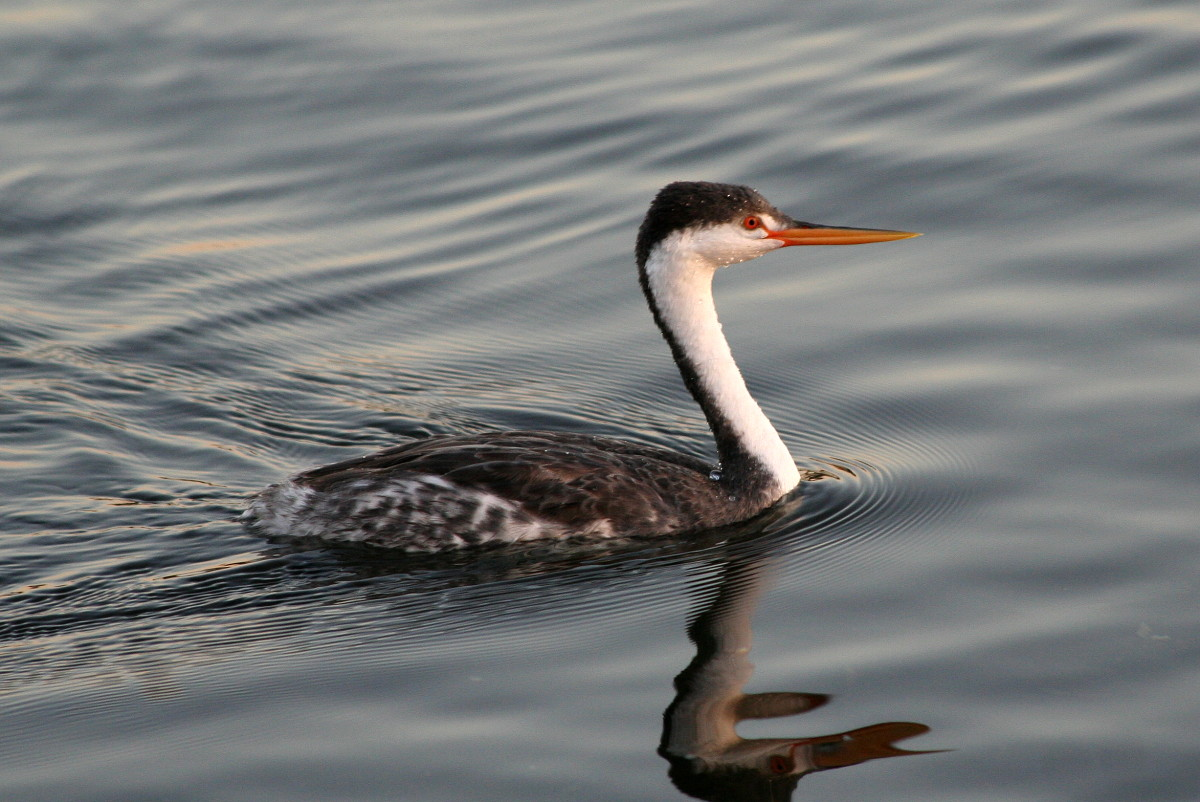
Clark's grebe

Order: Podicipediformes Family: Podicipedidae

Grebes are small to medium-large freshwater diving birds. They have lobed toes and are excellent swimmers and divers. However, they have their feet placed far back on the body, making them quite ungainly on land. Six species have been recorded in Wyoming.

- Pied-billed grebe, Podilymbus podiceps
- Horned grebe, Podiceps auritus
- Red-necked grebe, Podiceps grisegena (A)
- Eared grebe, Podiceps nigricollis
- Western grebe, Aechmorphorus occidentalis
- Clark's grebe, Aechmorphorus clarkii

== Pigeons and doves ==
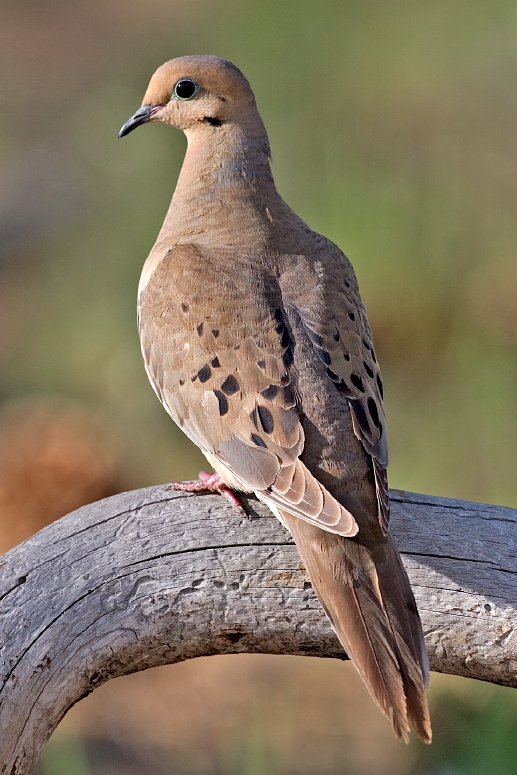
Mourning dove

Order: Columbiformes Family: Columbidae

Pigeons and doves are stout-bodied birds with short necks and short slender bills with a fleshy cere. Five species have been recorded in Wyoming.

- Rock pigeon, Columba livia (I)
- Band-tailed pigeon, Patagioenas fasciata
- Eurasian collared-dove, Streptopelia decaocto (I)
- White-winged dove, Zenaida asiatica (A)
- Mourning dove, Zenaida macroura

== Cuckoos ==
Order: Cuculiformes Family: Cuculidae

The family Cuculidae includes cuckoos, roadrunners, and anis. These birds are of variable size with slender bodies, long tails, and strong legs. Two species have been recorded in Wyoming.

- Yellow-billed cuckoo, Coccyzus americanus
- Black-billed cuckoo, Coccyzus erythropthalmus

== Nightjars and allies ==
Order: Caprimulgiformes Family: Caprimulgidae

Nightjars are medium-sized nocturnal birds that usually nest on the ground. They have long wings, short legs, and very short bills. Most have small feet, of little use for walking, and long pointed wings. Their soft plumage is cryptically colored to resemble bark or leaves. Three species have been recorded in Wyoming.

- Lesser nighthawk, Chordeiles acutipennis (A)
- Common nighthawk, Chordeiles minor
- Common poorwill, Phalaenoptilus nuttallii

== Swifts ==
Order: Apodiformes Family: Apodidae

The swifts are small birds which spend the majority of their lives flying. These birds have very short legs and never settle voluntarily on the ground, perching instead only on vertical surfaces. Many swifts have very long, swept-back wings which resemble a crescent or boomerang. Four species have been recorded in Wyoming.

- Black swift, Cypseloides niger
- Chimney swift, Chaetura pelagica
- Vaux's swift, Chaetura vauxi (A)
- White-throated swift, Aeronautes saxatalis

== Hummingbirds ==
Order: Apodiformes Family: Trochilidae

Hummingbirds are small birds capable of hovering in mid-air due to the rapid flapping of their wings. They are the only birds that can fly backwards. Seven species have been recorded in Wyoming.

- Rivoli's hummingbird, Eugenes fulgens (A)
- Ruby-throated hummingbird, Archilochus colubris (A)
- Black-chinned hummingbird, Archilochus alexandri
- Anna's hummingbird, Calypte anna (A)
- Calliope hummingbird, Selasphorus calliope
- Rufous hummingbird, Selasphorus rufus
- Broad-tailed hummingbird, Selasphorus platycercus

== Rails, gallinules, and coots ==
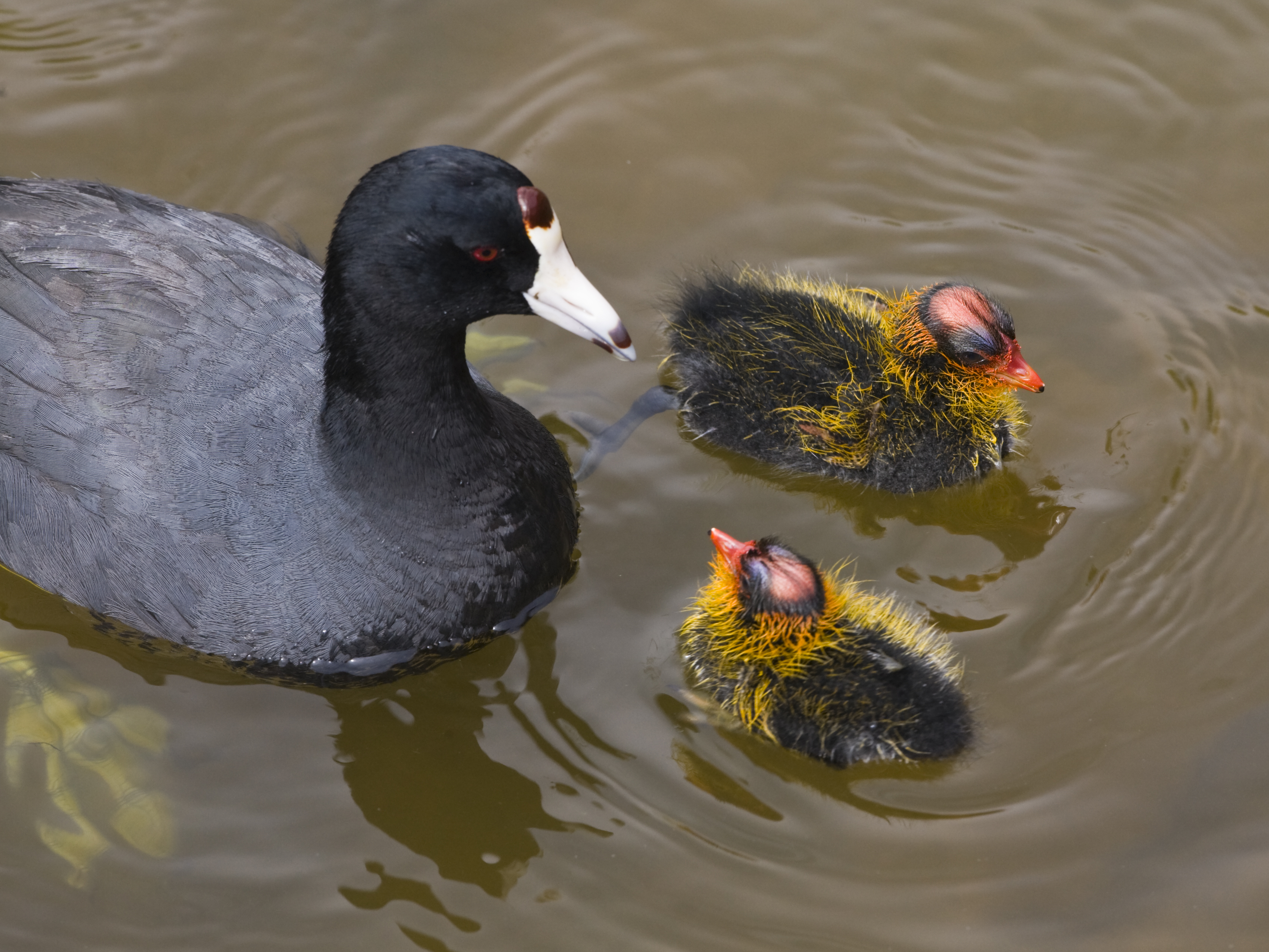
American coot

Order: Gruiformes Family: Rallidae

Rallidae is a large family of small to medium-sized birds which includes the rails, crakes, coots, and gallinules. The most typical family members occupy dense vegetation in damp environments near lakes, swamps, or rivers. In general they are shy and secretive birds, making them difficult to observe. Most species have strong legs and long toes which are well adapted to soft uneven surfaces. They tend to have short, rounded wings and tend to be weak fliers. Seven species have been recorded in Wyoming.

- Virginia rail, Rallus limicola
- Sora, Porzana carolina
- Common gallinule, Gallinula galeata (A)
- American coot, Fulica americana
- Purple gallinule, Porphyrio martinicus (A)
- Yellow rail, Coturnicops noveboracensis (A)
- Black rail, Laterallus jamaicensis (A)

== Cranes ==
Order: Gruiformes Family: Gruidae

Cranes are large, long-legged, and long-necked birds. Unlike the similar-looking but unrelated herons, cranes fly with necks outstretched, not pulled back. Most have elaborate and noisy courting displays or "dances". Two species have been recorded in Wyoming.

- Sandhill crane, Antigone canadensis
- Whooping crane, Grus americana

== Stilts and avocets ==
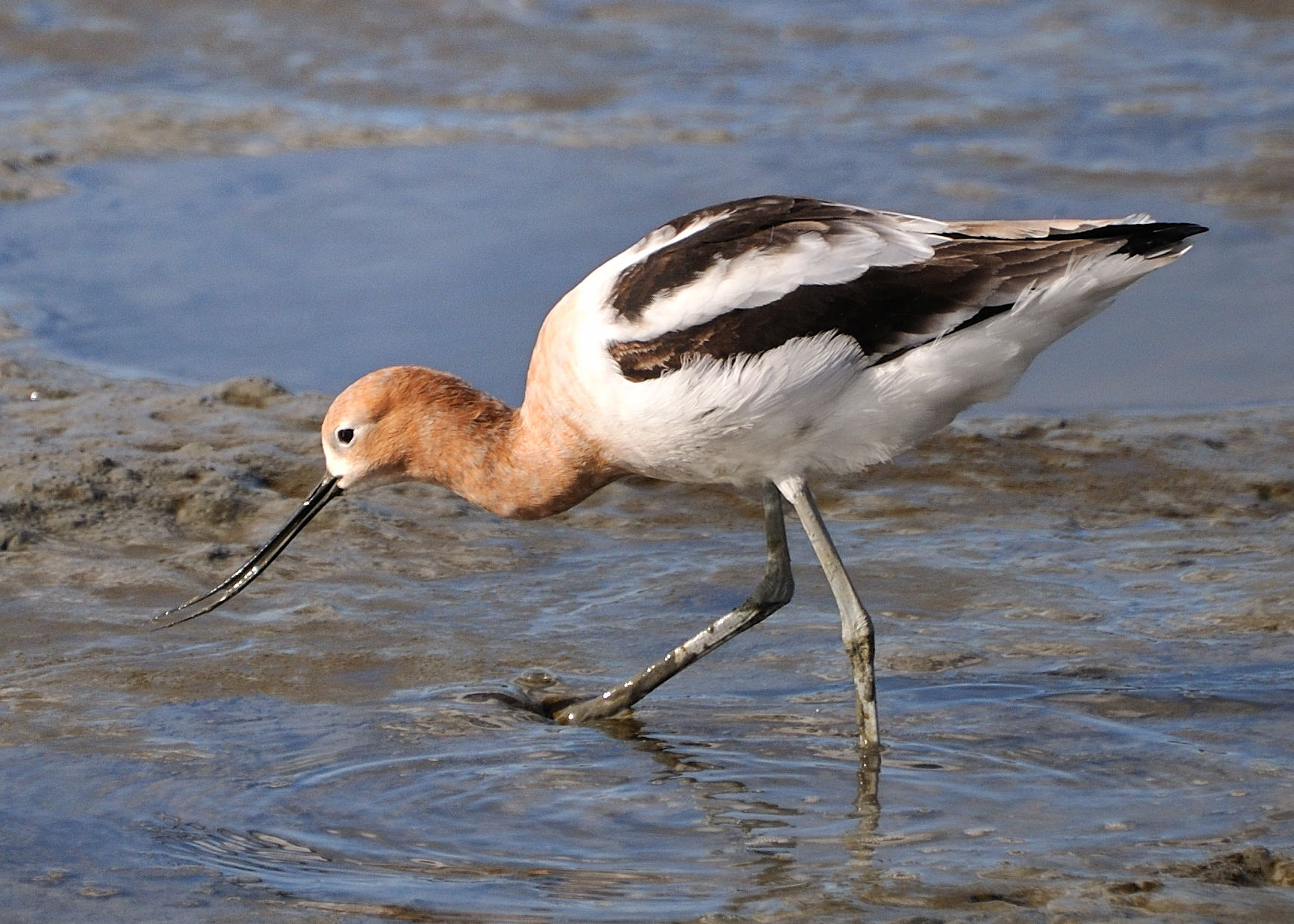
American avocet

Order: Charadriiformes Family: Recurvirostridae

Recurvirostridae is a family of large wading birds which includes the avocets and stilts. The avocets have long legs and long up-curved bills. The stilts have extremely long legs and long, thin, straight bills. Two species have been recorded in Wyoming.

- Black-necked stilt, Himantopus mexicanus
- American avocet, Recurvirostra americana

== Plovers and lapwings ==
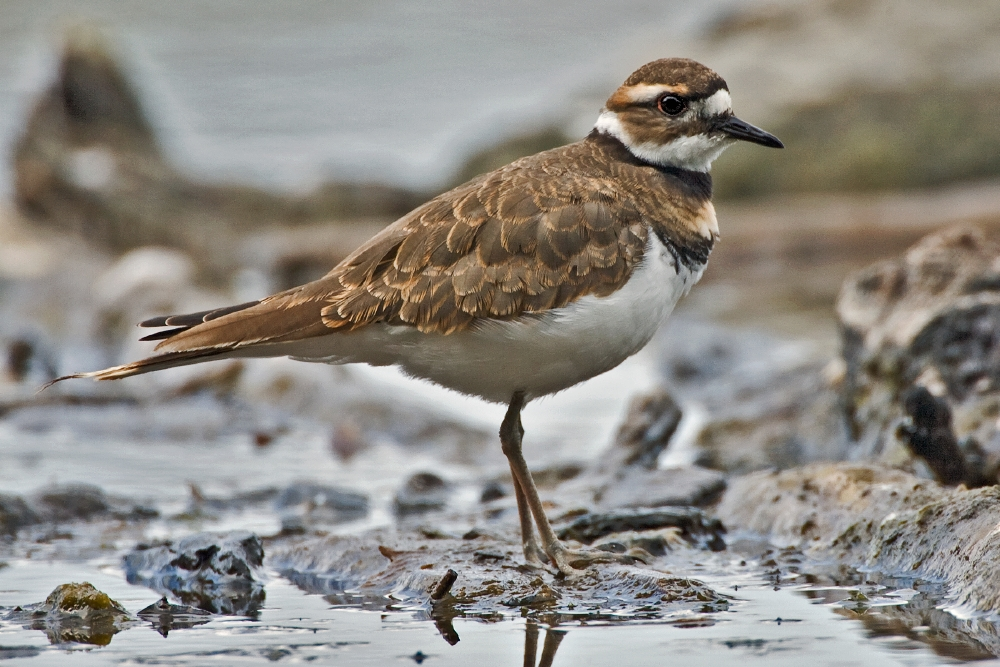
Killdeer

Order: Charadriiformes Family: Charadriidae

The family Charadriidae includes the plovers, dotterels, and lapwings. They are small to medium-sized birds with compact bodies, short thick necks, and long, usually pointed, wings. They are found in open country worldwide, mostly in habitats near water. Seven species have been recorded in Wyoming.

- Black-bellied plover, Pluvialis squatarola
- American golden-plover, Pluvialis dominica
- Killdeer, Charadrius vociferus
- Semipalmated plover, Charadrius semipalmatus
- Piping plover, Charadrius melodus
- Snowy plover, Charadrius nivosus
- Mountain plover, Charadrius montanus

== Sandpipers and allies ==
Order: Charadriiformes Family: Scolopacidae

Scolopacidae is a large diverse family of small to medium-sized shorebirds including the sandpipers, curlews, godwits, shanks, tattlers, woodcocks, snipes, dowitchers, and phalaropes. The majority of these species eat small invertebrates picked out of the mud or soil. Different lengths of legs and bills enable multiple species to feed in the same habitat, particularly on the coast, without direct competition for food. Twenty-nine species have been recorded in Wyoming.

- Upland sandpiper, Bartramia longicauda
- Hudsonian whimbrel, Numenius hudsonicus
- Long-billed curlew, Numenius americanus
- Hudsonian godwit, Limosa haemastica
- Marbled godwit, Limosa fedoa
- Ruddy turnstone, Arenaria interpres
- Red knot, Calidris canutus
- Stilt sandpiper, Calidris himantopus
- Sanderling, Calidris alba
- Dunlin, Calidris alpina
- Baird's sandpiper, Calidris bairdii
- Least sandpiper, Calidris minutilla
- White-rumped sandpiper, Calidris fuscicollis
- Buff-breasted sandpiper, Calidris subruficollis
- Pectoral sandpiper, Calidris melanotos
- Semipalmated sandpiper, Calidris pusilla
- Western sandpiper, Calidris mauri
- Short-billed dowitcher, Limnodromus griseus
- Long-billed dowitcher, Limnodromus scolopaceus
- American woodcock, Scolopax minor (A)
- Wilson's snipe, Gallinago delicata
- Spotted sandpiper, Actitis macularius
- Solitary sandpiper, Tringa solitaria
- Lesser yellowlegs, Tringa flavipes
- Willet, Tringa semipalmata
- Greater yellowlegs, Tringa melanoleuca
- Wilson's phalarope, Phalaropus tricolor
- Red-necked phalarope, Phalaropus lobatus
- Red phalarope, Phalaropus fulicarius (A)

== Skuas and jaegers ==
Order: Charadriiformes Family: Stercorariidae

Skuas and jaegers are in general medium to large birds, typically with gray or brown plumage, often with white markings on the wings. They have longish bills with hooked tips and webbed feet with sharp claws. They look like large dark gulls, but have a fleshy cere above the upper mandible. They are strong, acrobatic fliers. Three species have been recorded in Wyoming.

- Pomarine jaeger, Stercorarius pomarinus (A)
- Parasitic jaeger, Stercorarius parasiticus (A)
- Long-tailed jaeger, Stercorarius longicaudus (A)

== Auks, murres, and puffins ==
Order: Charadriiformes Family: Alcidae

The family Alcidae includes auks, murres, and puffins. These are short-winged birds that live on the open sea and normally only come ashore for breeding. Two species have been recorded in Wyoming.

- Long-billed murrelet, Brachyramphus perdix (A)
- Ancient murrelet, Synthliboarmphus antiquus (A)

== Gulls, terns, and skimmers ==
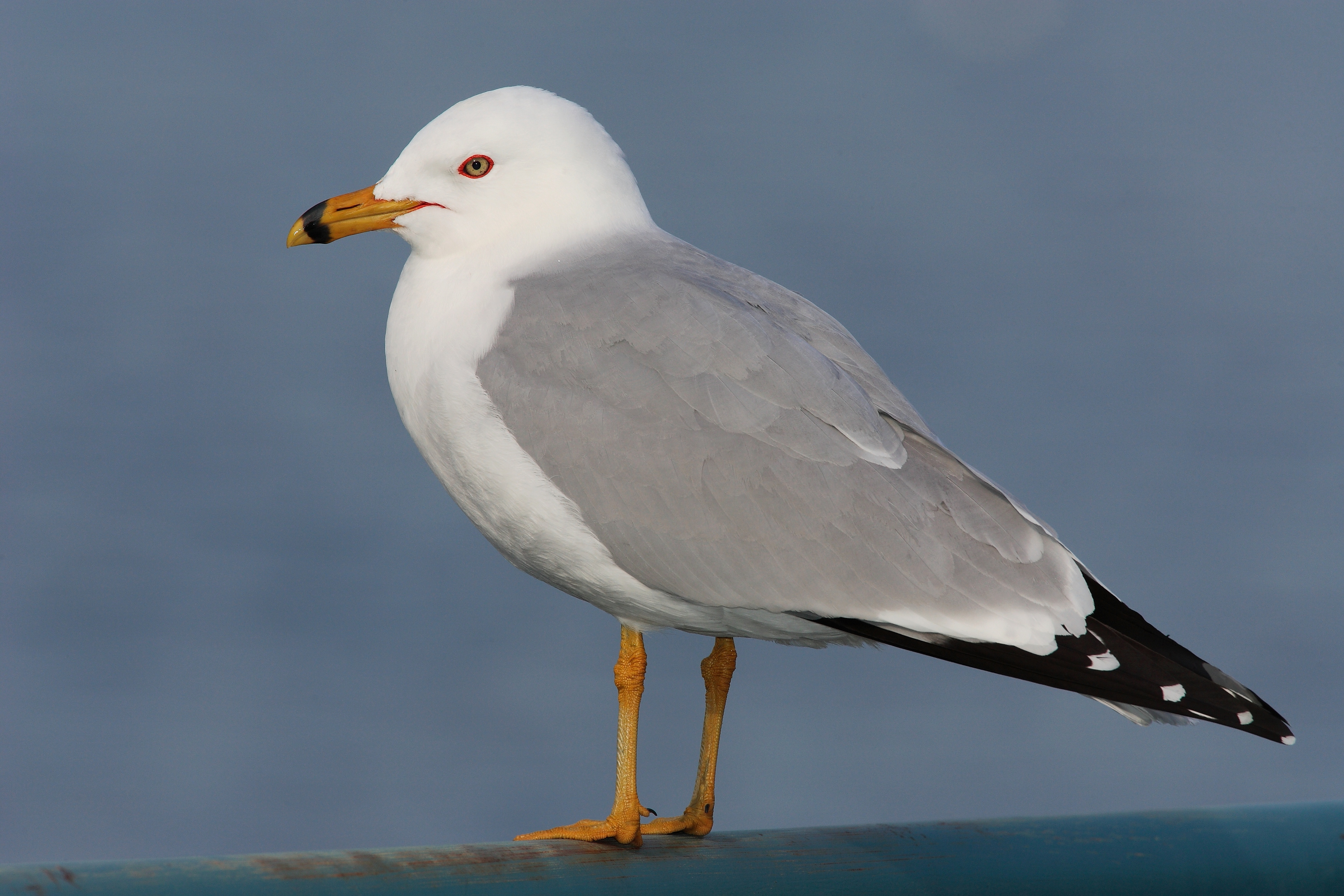
Ring-billed gull

Order: Charadriiformes Family: Laridae

Laridae is a family of medium to large seabirds and includes gulls, terns, kittiwakes, and skimmers. They are typically gray or white, often with black markings on the head or wings. They have stout, longish bills and webbed feet. Twenty-two species have been recorded in Wyoming.

- Black-legged kittiwake, Rissa tridactyla (A)
- Sabine's gull, Xema sabini
- Bonaparte's gull, Chroicocephalus philadelphia
- Black-headed gull, Chroicocephalus ridibundus (A)
- Little gull, Hydrocoloeus minutus (A)
- Ross's gull, Rhodostethia rosea (A)
- Laughing gull, Leucophaeus atricilla (A)
- Franklin's gull, Leucophaeus pipixcan
- Heermann's gull, Larus heermanni (A)
- Short-billed gull, Larus brachyrhynchus (A)
- Ring-billed gull, Larus delawarensis
- California gull, Larus californicus
- American herring gull, Larus smithsonianus
- Iceland gull, Larus glaucoides (A)
- Lesser black-backed gull, Larus fuscus (A)
- Glaucous-winged gull, Larus glaucescens (A)
- Glaucous gull, Larus hyperboreus (A)
- Great black-backed gull, Larus marinus (A)
- Least tern, Sternula antillarum (A)
- Caspian tern, Hydroprogne caspia
- Black tern, Chlidonias niger
- Common tern, Sterna hirundo
- Arctic tern, Sterna paradisaea (A)
- Forster's tern, Sterna forsteri

== Loons ==
Order: Gaviiformes Family: Gaviidae

Loons are aquatic birds the size of a large duck, to which they are unrelated. Their plumage is largely gray or black, and they have spear-shaped bills. Loons swim well and fly adequately, but are almost hopeless on land, because their legs are placed towards the rear of the body. Four species have been recorded in Wyoming.

- Red-throated loon, Gavia stellata
- Pacific loon, Gavia pacifica
- Common loon, Gavia immer
- Yellow-billed loon, Gavia adamsii (A)

== Shearwaters and petrels ==
Order: Procellariiformes Family: Procellariidae

The procellariids are the main group of medium-sized "true petrels", characterized by united nostrils with medium septum and a long outer functional primary.

- Streaked shearwater, Calonectris leucomelas (A)

== Storks ==
Order: Ciconiiformes Family: Ciconiidae

Storks are large, heavy, long-legged, long-necked wading birds with long stout bills and wide wingspans. They lack the powder down that other wading birds such as herons, spoonbills, and ibises use to clean off fish slime. Storks lack a pharynx and are mute. One species has been recorded in Wyoming.

- Wood stork, Mycteria americana (A)

== Frigatebirds ==
Order: Suliformes Family: Fregatidae

Frigatebirds are large seabirds usually found over tropical oceans. They are large, black, or black-and-white, with long wings and deeply forked tails. The males have colored inflatable throat pouches. They do not swim or walk and cannot take off from a flat surface. Having the largest wingspan-to-body-weight ratio of any bird, they are essentially aerial, able to stay aloft for more than a week. One species has been recorded in Wyoming.

- Lesser frigatebird, Fregata ariel (A)

== Cormorants and shags ==
Order: Suliformes Family: Phalacrocoracidae

Cormorants are medium-to-large aquatic birds, usually with mainly dark plumage and areas of colored skin on the face. The bill is long, thin, and sharply hooked. Their feet are four-toed and webbed. One species has been recorded in Wyoming.

- Double-crested cormorant, Nannopterum auritum
- Neotropic cormorant, Nannopterum brasilianum (A)

== Pelicans ==
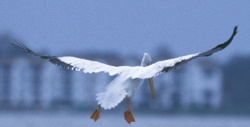
American white pelican

Order: Pelecaniformes Family: Pelecanidae

Pelicans are very large water birds with a distinctive pouch under their beak. Like other birds in the order Pelecaniformes, they have four webbed toes. Two species have been recorded in Wyoming.

- American white pelican, Pelecanus erythrorhynchos
- Brown pelican, Pelecanus occidentalis (A)

== Herons, egrets, and bitterns ==
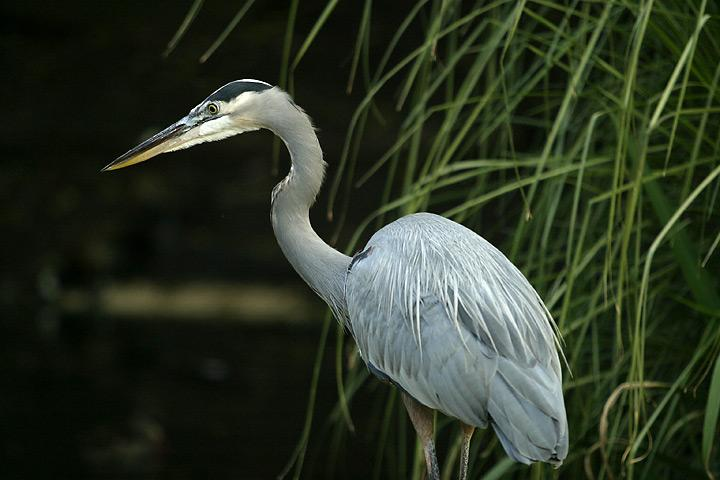
Great blue heron

Order: Pelecaniformes Family: Ardeidae

The family Ardeidae contains the herons, egrets, and bitterns. Herons and egrets are medium to large wading birds with long necks and legs. Bitterns tend to be shorter necked and more secretive. Members of Ardeidae fly with their necks retracted, unlike other long-necked birds such as storks, ibises, and spoonbills. Eleven species have been recorded in Wyoming.

- American bittern, Botaurus lentiginosus
- Least bittern, Ixobrychus exilis (A)
- Great blue heron, Ardea herodias
- Great egret, Ardea alba (A)
- Snowy egret, Egretta thula
- Little blue heron, Egretta caerulea (A)
- Tricolored heron, Egretta tricolor (A)
- Cattle egret, Bubulcus ibis
- Green heron, Butorides virescens
- Black-crowned night-heron Nycticorax nycticorax
- Yellow-crowned night-heron, Nyctanassa violacea (A)

== Ibises and spoonbills ==
Order: Pelecaniformes Family: Threskiornithidae

The family Threskiornithidae includes the ibises and spoonbills. They have long, broad wings. Their bodies tend to be elongated, the neck more so, with rather long legs. The bill is also long, decurved in the case of the ibises, straight and distinctively flattened in the spoonbills. Three species have been recorded in Wyoming.

- White ibis, Eudocimus albus (A)
- Glossy ibis, Plegadis falcinellus (A)
- White-faced ibis, Plegadis chihi

== New World vultures ==
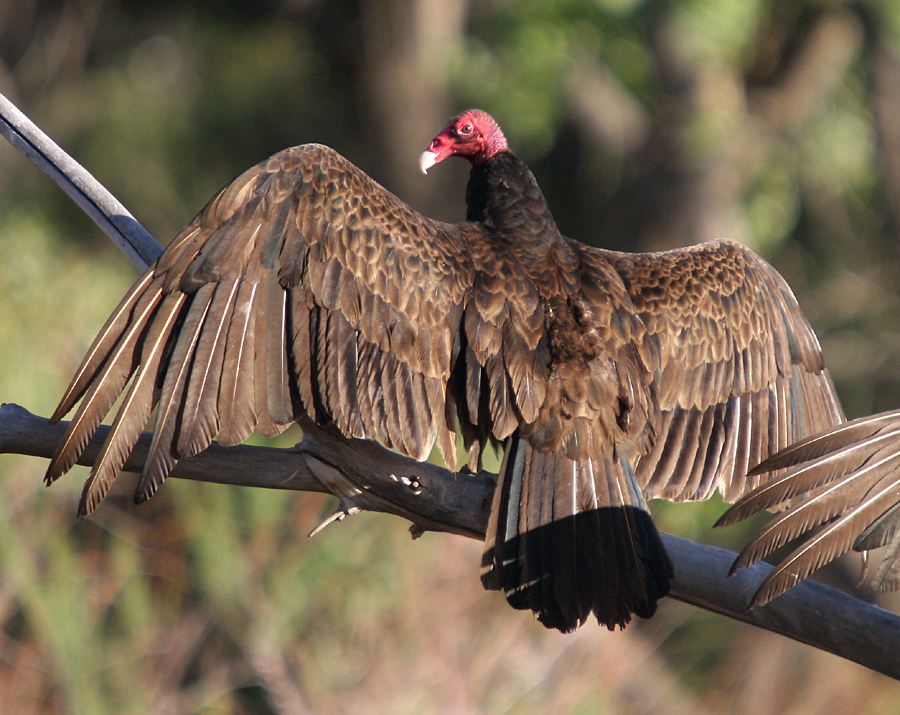
Turkey vulture

Order: Cathartiformes Family: Cathartidae

The New World vultures are not closely related to Old World vultures, but superficially resemble them because of convergent evolution. Like the Old World vultures, they are scavengers, however, unlike Old World vultures, which find carcasses by sight, New World vultures have a good sense of smell with which they locate carcasses. Three species have been recorded in Wyoming.

- California condor, Gymnogyps californianus (A)
- Black vulture, Coragyps atratus (A)
- Turkey vulture, Cathartes aura

== Osprey ==
Order: Accipitriformes Family: Pandionidae

Pandionidae is a family of fish-eating birds of prey possessing a very large, powerful hooked beak for tearing flesh from their prey, strong legs, powerful talons, and keen eyesight. The family is monotypic.

- Osprey, Pandion haliaetus

== Hawks, eagles, and kites ==
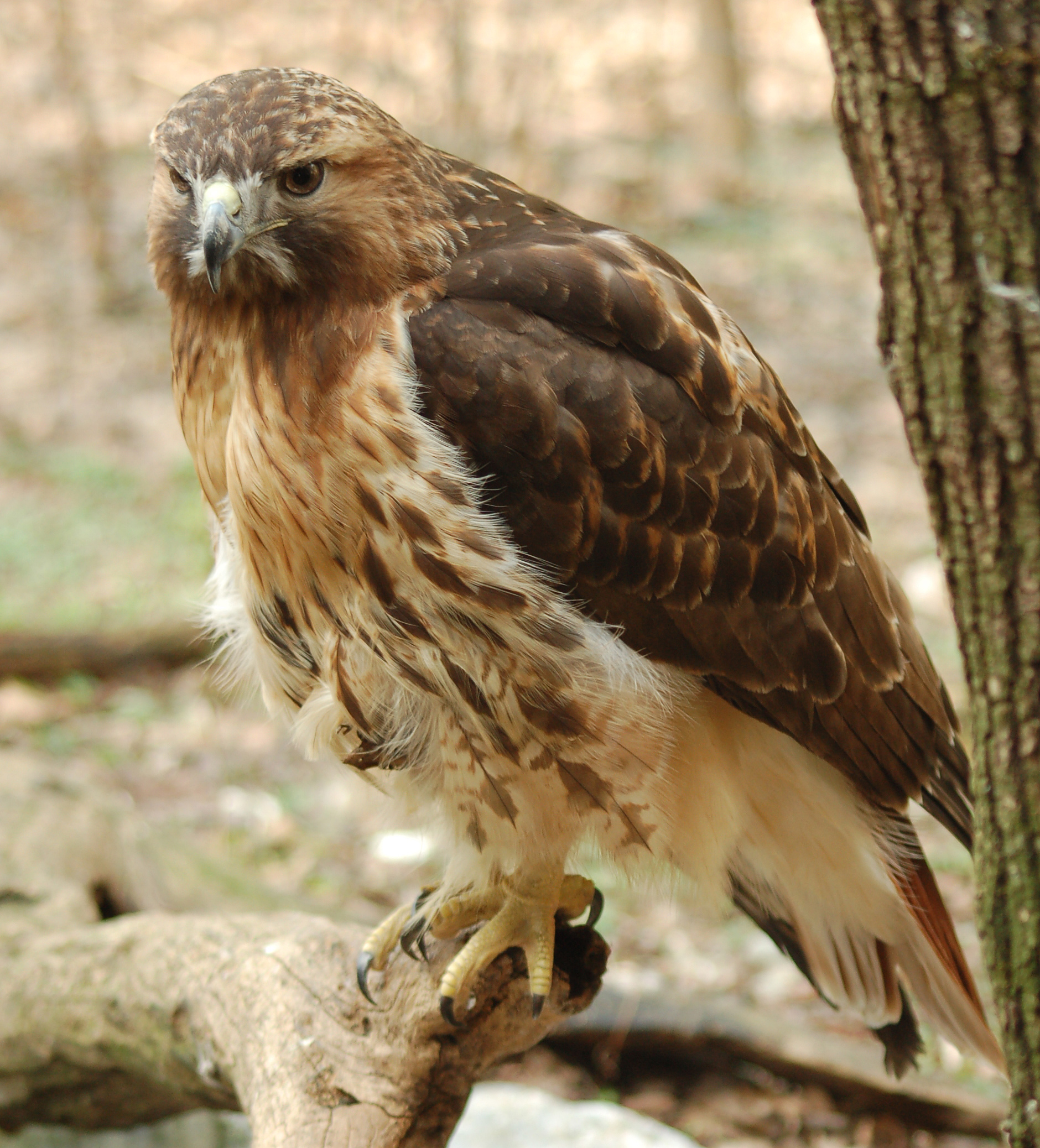
Red-tailed hawk

Order: Accipitriformes Family: Accipitridae

Accipitridae is a family of birds of prey which includes hawks, eagles, kites, harriers, and Old World vultures. These birds have very large powerful hooked beaks for tearing flesh from their prey, strong legs, powerful talons, and keen eyesight. Sixteen species have been recorded in Wyoming.

- White-tailed kite, Elanus leucurus (A)
- Swallow-tailed kite, Elanoides forficatus (A)
- Golden eagle, Aquila chrysaetos
- Northern harrier, Circus hudsonius
- Sharp-shinned hawk, Accipiter striatus
- Cooper's hawk, Accipiter cooperii
- American goshawk, Accipiter atricapillus
- Bald eagle, Haliaeetus leucocephalus
- Mississippi kite, Ictinia mississippiensis (A)
- Harris's hawk, Parabuteo unicinctus (A)
- Red-shouldered hawk, Buteo lineatus (A)
- Broad-winged hawk, Buteo platypterus
- Swainson's hawk, Buteo swainsoni
- Red-tailed hawk, Buteo jamaicensis
- Rough-legged hawk, Buteo lagopus
- Ferruginous hawk, Buteo regalis

== Barn-owls ==
Order: Strigiformes Family: Tytonidae

Barn-owls are medium to large owls with large heads and characteristic heart-shaped faces. They have long strong legs with powerful talons.

- American barn owl, Tyto furcata

== Owls ==
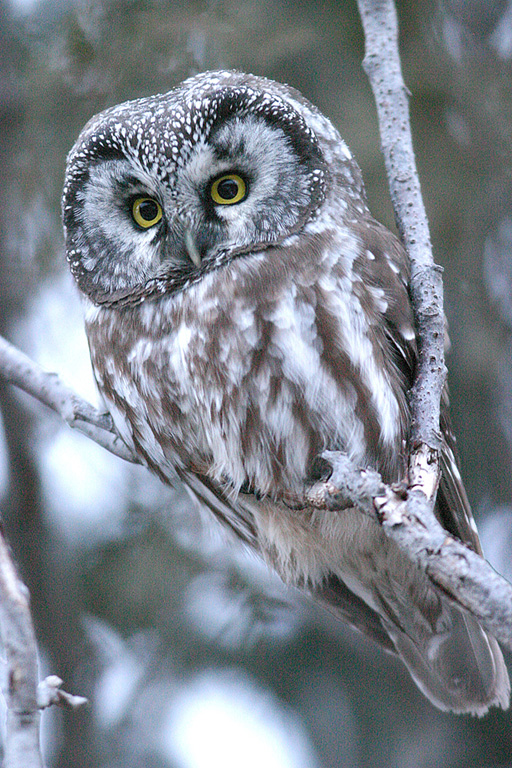
Boreal owl

Order: Strigiformes Family: Strigidae

Typical owls are small to large solitary nocturnal birds of prey. They have large forward-facing eyes and ears, a hawk-like beak, and a conspicuous circle of feathers around each eye called a facial disk. Fourteen species have been recorded in Wyoming.

- Flammulated owl, Psiloscops flammeolus
- Western screech-owl, Megascops kennicottii
- Eastern screech-owl, Megascops asio
- Great horned owl, Bubo virginianus
- Snowy owl, Bubo scandiacus
- Northern hawk owl, Surnia ulula (A)
- Northern pygmy-owl, Glaucidium gnoma
- Burrowing owl, Athene cunicularia
- Barred owl, Strix varia (A)
- Great gray owl, Strix nebulosa
- Long-eared owl, Asio otus
- Short-eared owl, Asio flammeus
- Boreal owl, Aegolius funereus
- Northern saw-whet owl, Aegolius acadicus

== Kingfishers ==
Order: Coraciiformes Family: Alcedinidae

Kingfishers are medium-sized birds with large heads, long pointed bills, short legs, and stubby tails. One species has been recorded in Wyoming.

- Belted kingfisher, Megaceryle alcyon

== Woodpeckers ==
Order: Piciformes Family: Picidae

Woodpeckers are small to medium-sized birds with chisel-like beaks, short legs, stiff tails, and long tongues used for capturing insects. Some species have feet with two toes pointing forward and two backward, while several species have only three toes. Many woodpeckers have the habit of tapping noisily on tree trunks with their beaks. Fourteen species have been recorded in Wyoming.

- Lewis's woodpecker, Melanerpes lewis
- Red-headed woodpecker, Melanerpes erythrocephalus
- Acorn woodpecker, Melanerpes formicivorus (A)
- Red-bellied woodpecker, Melanerpes carolinus (A)
- Williamson's sapsucker, Sphyrapicus thyroideus
- Yellow-bellied sapsucker, Sphyrapicus varius (A)
- Red-naped sapsucker, Sphyrapicus nuchalis
- American three-toed woodpecker, Picoides dorsalis
- Black-backed woodpecker, Picoides arcticus
- Downy woodpecker, Dryobates pubescens
- Hairy woodpecker, Dryobates villosus
- White-headed woodpecker, Dryobates albolarvatus (A)
- Northern flicker, Colaptes auratus
- Pileated woodpecker, Dryocopus pileatus (A)

== Falcons and caracaras ==
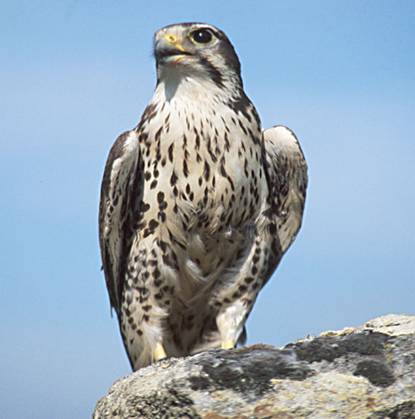
Prairie falcon

Order: Falconiformes Family: Falconidae

Falconidae is a family of diurnal birds of prey, notably the falcons and caracaras. They differ from hawks, eagles, and kites in that they kill with their beaks instead of their talons. Six species have been recorded in Wyoming.

- Crested caracara, Caracara plancus (A)
- American kestrel, Falco sparverius
- Merlin, Falco columbarius
- Gyrfalcon, Falco rusticolus (A)
- Peregrine falcon, Falco peregrinus
- Prairie falcon, Falco mexicanus

== Tyrant flycatchers ==
Order: Passeriformes Family: Tyrannidae

Tyrant flycatchers are Passerine birds which occur throughout North and South America. They superficially resemble the Old World flycatchers, but are more robust and have stronger bills. They do not have the sophisticated vocal capabilities of the songbirds. Most, but not all, are rather plain. As the name implies, most are insectivorous. Twenty-one species have been recorded in Wyoming.

- Ash-throated flycatcher, Myiarchus cinerascens
- Great crested flycatcher, Myiarchus crinitus (A)
- Cassin's kingbird, Tyrannus vociferans
- Western kingbird, Tyrannus verticalis
- Eastern kingbird, Tyrannus tyrannus
- Scissor-tailed flycatcher, Tyrannus forficatus (A)
- Fork-tailed flycatcher, Tyrannus savana (A)
- Olive-sided flycatcher, Contopus cooperi
- Western wood-pewee, Contopus sordidulus
- Eastern wood-pewee, Contopus virens (A)
- Alder flycatcher, Empidonax alnorum (A)
- Willow flycatcher, Empidonax traillii
- Least flycatcher, Empidonax minimus
- Hammond's flycatcher, Empidonax hammondii
- Gray flycatcher, Empidonax wrightii
- Dusky flycatcher, Empidonax oberholseri
- Western flycatcher, Empidonax difficilis
- Black phoebe, Sayornis nigricans (A)
- Eastern phoebe, Sayornis phoebe
- Say's phoebe, Sayornis saya
- Vermilion flycatcher, Pyrocephalus rubinus (A)

== Vireos, shrike-babblers, and erpornis ==
Order: Passeriformes Family: Vireonidae

The vireos are a group of small to medium-sized passerine birds. They are typically greenish in color and resemble wood warblers apart from their heavier bills. Nine species have been recorded in Wyoming.

- White-eyed vireo, Vireo griseus (A)
- Bell's vireo, Vireo bellii (A)
- Gray vireo, Vireo vicinior
- Yellow-throated vireo, Vireo flavifrons (A)
- Cassin's vireo, Vireo cassinii
- Blue-headed vireo, Vireo solitarius
- Plumbeous vireo, Vireo plumbeous
- Philadelphia vireo, Vireo philadelphicus
- Warbling vireo, Vireo gilvus
- Red-eyed vireo, Vireo olivaceus

== Shrikes ==
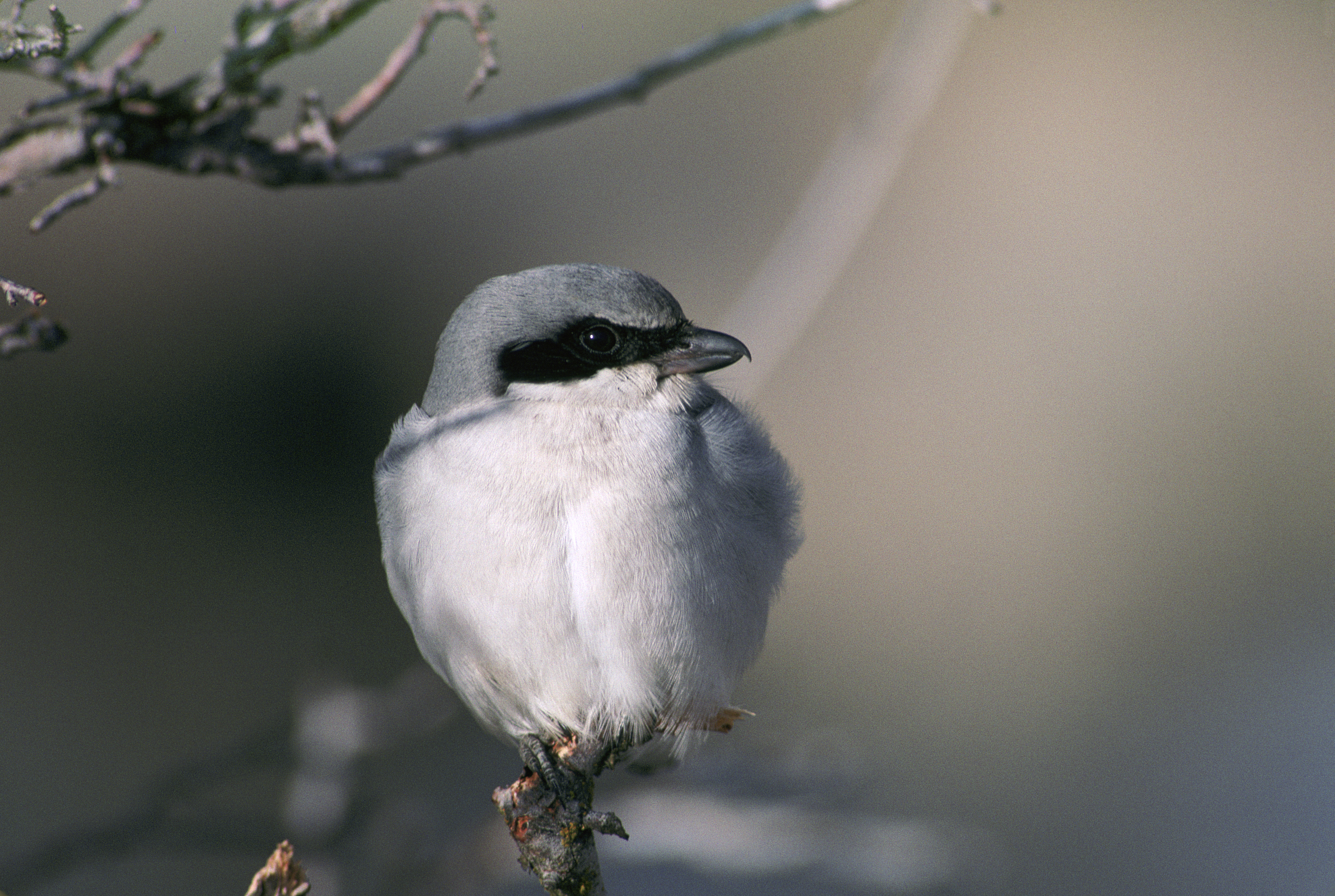
Loggerhead shrike

Order: Passeriformes Family: Laniidae

Shrikes are passerine birds known for their habit of catching other birds and small animals and impaling the uneaten portions of their bodies on thorns. A shrike's beak is hooked, like that of a typical bird of prey. Two species have been recorded in Wyoming.

- Loggerhead shrike, Lanius ludovicianus
- Northern shrike, Lanius borealis

== Crows, jays, and magpies ==
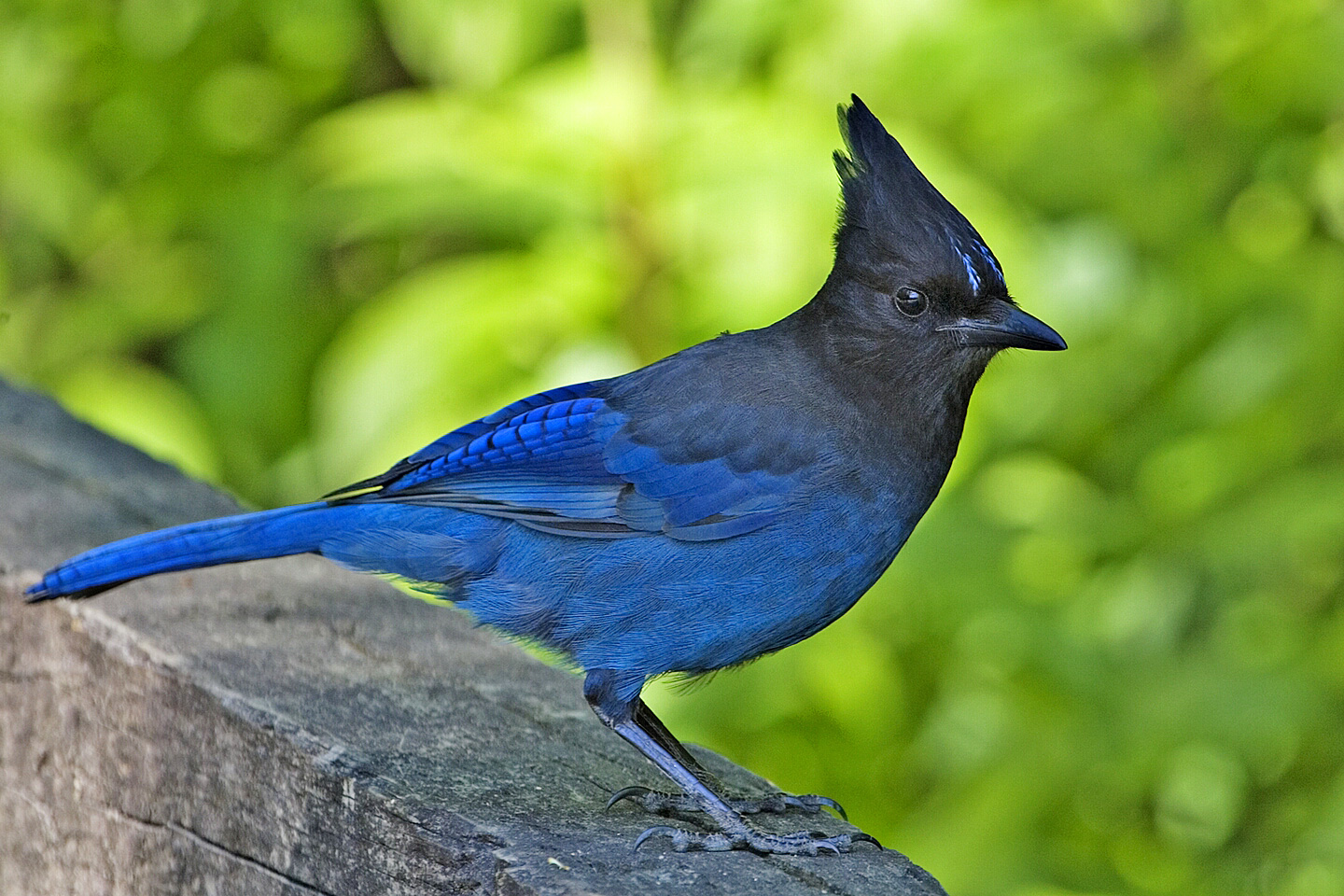
Steller's jay

Order: Passeriformes Family: Corvidae

The family Corvidae includes crows, ravens, jays, choughs, magpies, treepies, nutcrackers, and ground jays. Corvids are above average in size among the Passeriformes, and some of the larger species show high levels of intelligence. Nine species have been recorded in Wyoming.

- Canada jay, Perisoreus canadensis
- Pinyon jay, Gymnorhinus cyanocephalus
- Steller's jay, Cyanocitta stelleri
- Blue jay, Cyanocitta cristata
- Woodhouse's scrub-jay, Aphelocoma woodhouseii
- Clark's nutcracker, Nucifraga columbiana
- Black-billed magpie, Pica hudsonia
- American crow, Corvus brachyrhynchos
- Common raven, Corvus corax

== Tits, chickadees, and titmice ==
Order: Passeriformes Family: Paridae

The Paridae are mainly small stocky woodland species with short stout bills. Some have crests. They are adaptable birds, with a mixed diet including seeds and insects. Three species have been recorded in Wyoming.

- Black-capped chickadee, Poecile atricapilla
- Mountain chickadee, Poecile gambeli
- Juniper titmouse, Baeolophus ridgwayi

== Larks ==
Order: Passeriformes Family: Alaudidae

Larks are small terrestrial birds with often extravagant songs and display flights. Most larks are fairly dull in appearance. Their food is insects and seeds. One species has been recorded in Wyoming.

- Horned lark, Eremophila alpestris

== Swallows ==
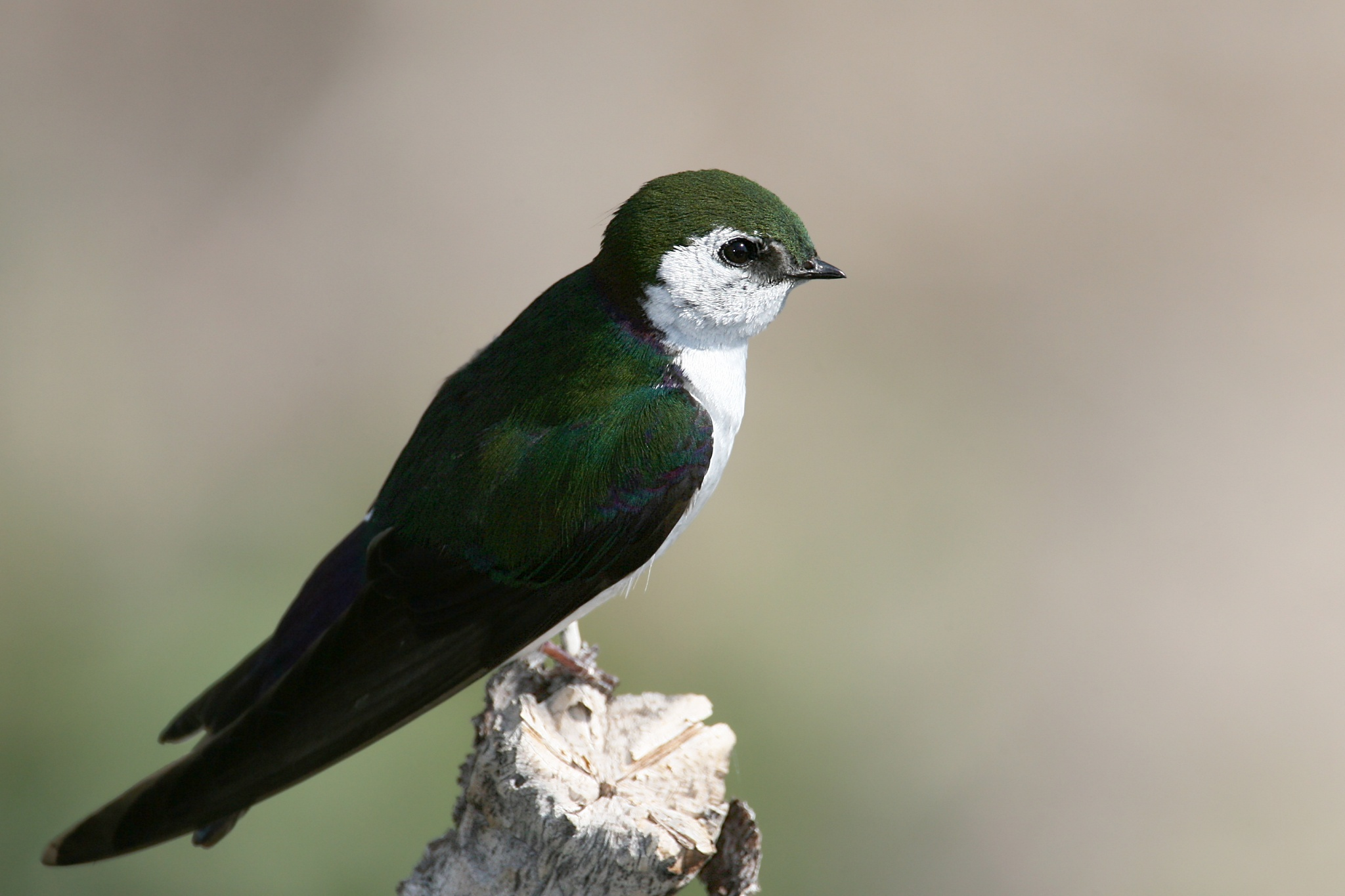
Violet-green swallow

Order: Passeriformes Family: Hirundinidae

The family Hirundinidae is adapted to aerial feeding. They have a slender streamlined body, long pointed wings, and a short bill with a wide gape. The feet are adapted to perching rather than walking, and the front toes are partially joined at the base. Seven species have been recorded in Wyoming.

- Bank swallow, Riparia riparia
- Tree swallow, Tachycineta bicolor
- Violet-green swallow, Tachycineta thalassina
- Northern rough-winged swallow, Stelgidopteryx serripennis
- Purple martin, Progne subis
- Barn swallow, Hirundo rustica
- Cliff swallow, Petrochelidon pyrrhonota

== Long-tailed tits ==
Order: Passeriformes Family: Aegithalidae

Long-tailed tits are a group of small passerine birds with medium to long tails. They make woven bag nests in trees. Most eat a mixed diet which includes insects. One species has been recorded in Wyoming.

- Bushtit, Psaltriparus minimus

== Kinglets ==
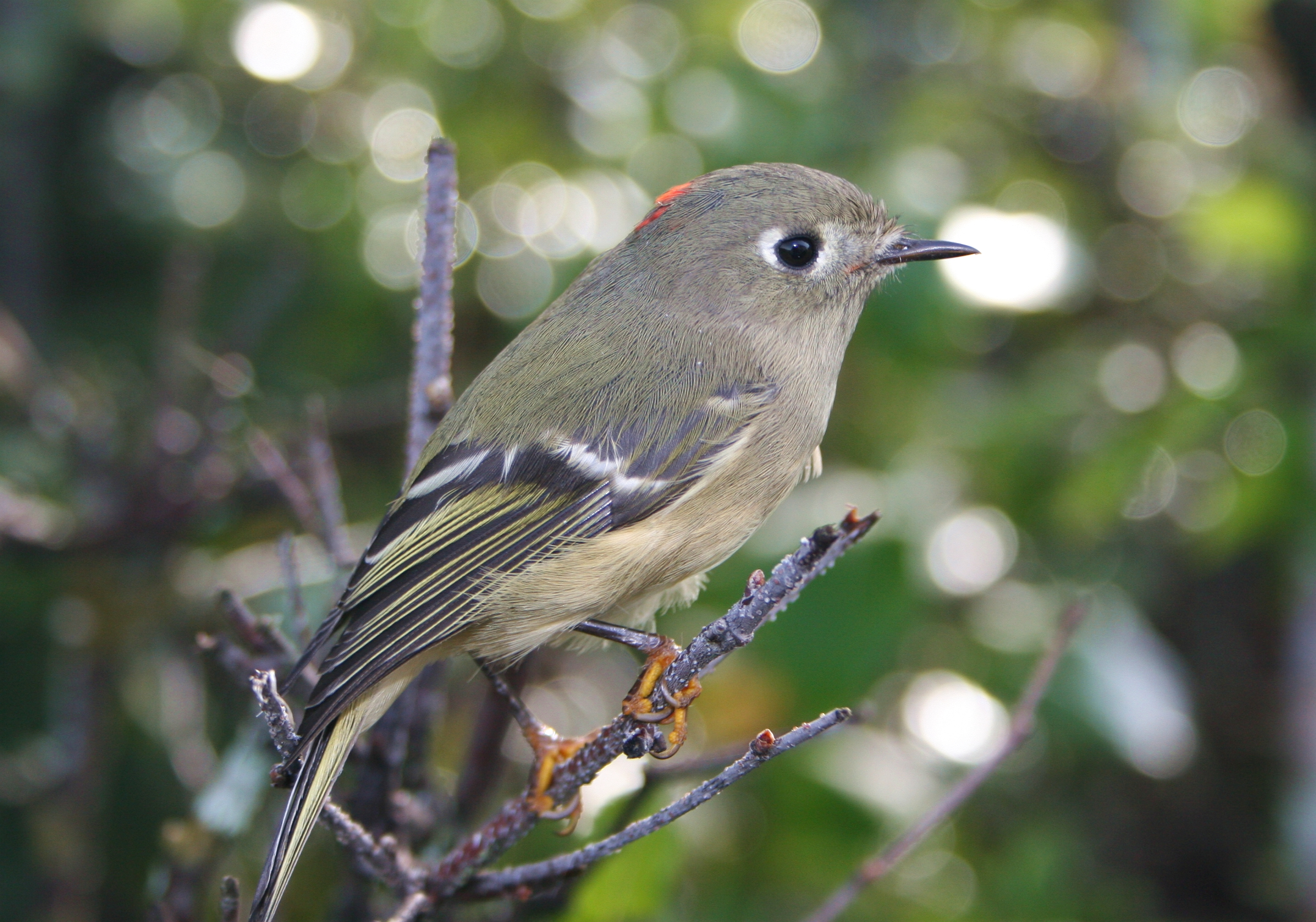
Ruby-crowned kinglet

Order: Passeriformes Family: Regulidae

The kinglets are a small family of birds which resemble the titmice. They are very small insectivorous birds. The adults have colored crowns, giving rise to their names. Two species have been recorded in Wyoming.

- Ruby-crowned kinglet, Corthylio calendula
- Golden-crowned kinglet, Regulus satrapa

== Waxwings ==
Order: Passeriformes Family: Bombycillidae

The waxwings are a group of passerine birds with soft silky plumage and unique red tips to some of the wing feathers. In the Bohemian and cedar waxwings, these tips look like sealing wax and give the group its name. These are arboreal birds of northern forests. They live on insects in summer and berries in winter. Two species have been recorded in Wyoming.

- Bohemian waxwing, Bombycilla garrulus
- Cedar waxwing, Bombycilla cedrorum

== Nuthatches ==
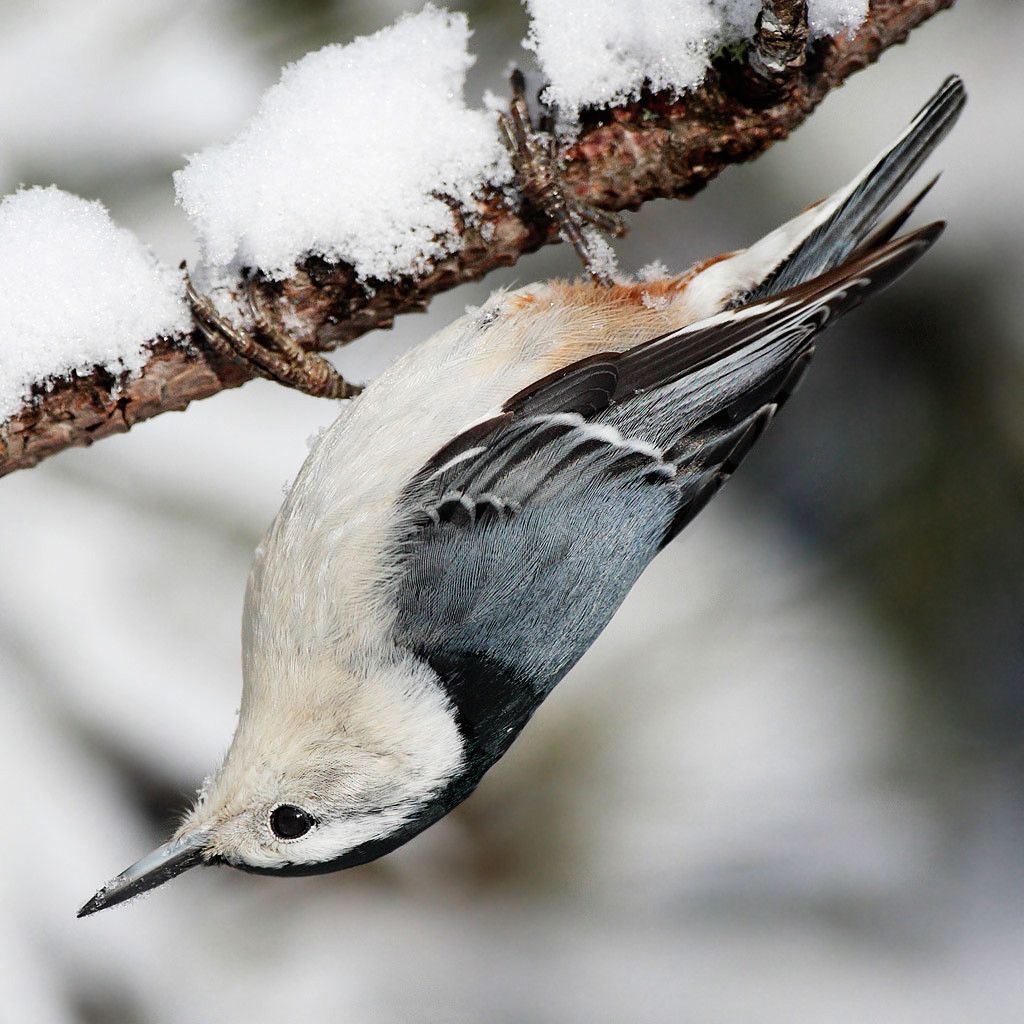
White-breasted nuthatch

Order: Passeriformes Family: Sittidae

Nuthatches are small woodland birds. They have the unusual ability to climb down trees head first, unlike other birds which can only go upwards. Nuthatches have big heads, short tails, and powerful bills and feet. Three species have been recorded in Wyoming.

- Red-breasted nuthatch, Sitta canadensis
- White-breasted nuthatch, Sitta carolinensis
- Pygmy nuthatch, Sitta pygmaea

== Treecreepers ==
Order: Passeriformes Family: Certhiidae

Treecreepers are small woodland birds, brown above and white below. They have thin pointed down-curved bills, which they use to extricate insects from bark. They have stiff tail feathers, like woodpeckers, which they use to support themselves on vertical trees. One species has been recorded in Wyoming.

- Brown creeper, Certhia americana

== Gnatcatchers ==
Order: Passeriformes Family: Polioptilidae

These dainty birds resemble Old World warblers in their structure and habits, moving restlessly through the foliage seeking insects. The gnatcatchers are mainly soft bluish gray in color and have the typical insectivore's long sharp bill. Many species have distinctive black head patterns (especially males) and long, regularly cocked, black-and-white tails. One species has been recorded in Wyoming.

- Blue-gray gnatcatcher, Polioptila caerulea

== Wrens ==
Order: Passeriformes Family: Troglodytidae

Wrens are small and inconspicuous birds, except for their loud songs. They have short wings and thin down-turned bills. Several species often hold their tails upright. All are insectivorous. Nine species have been recorded in Wyoming.

- Rock wren, Salpinctes obsoletus
- Canyon wren, Catherpes mexicanus
- House wren, Troglodytes aedon
- Pacific wren, Troglodytes pacificus
- Winter wren, Troglodytes hiemalis
- Sedge wren, Cistothorus platensis (A)
- Marsh wren, Cistothorus palustris
- Carolina wren, Thryothorus ludovicianus (A)
- Bewick's wren, Thryomanes bewickii

== Mockingbirds and thrashers ==
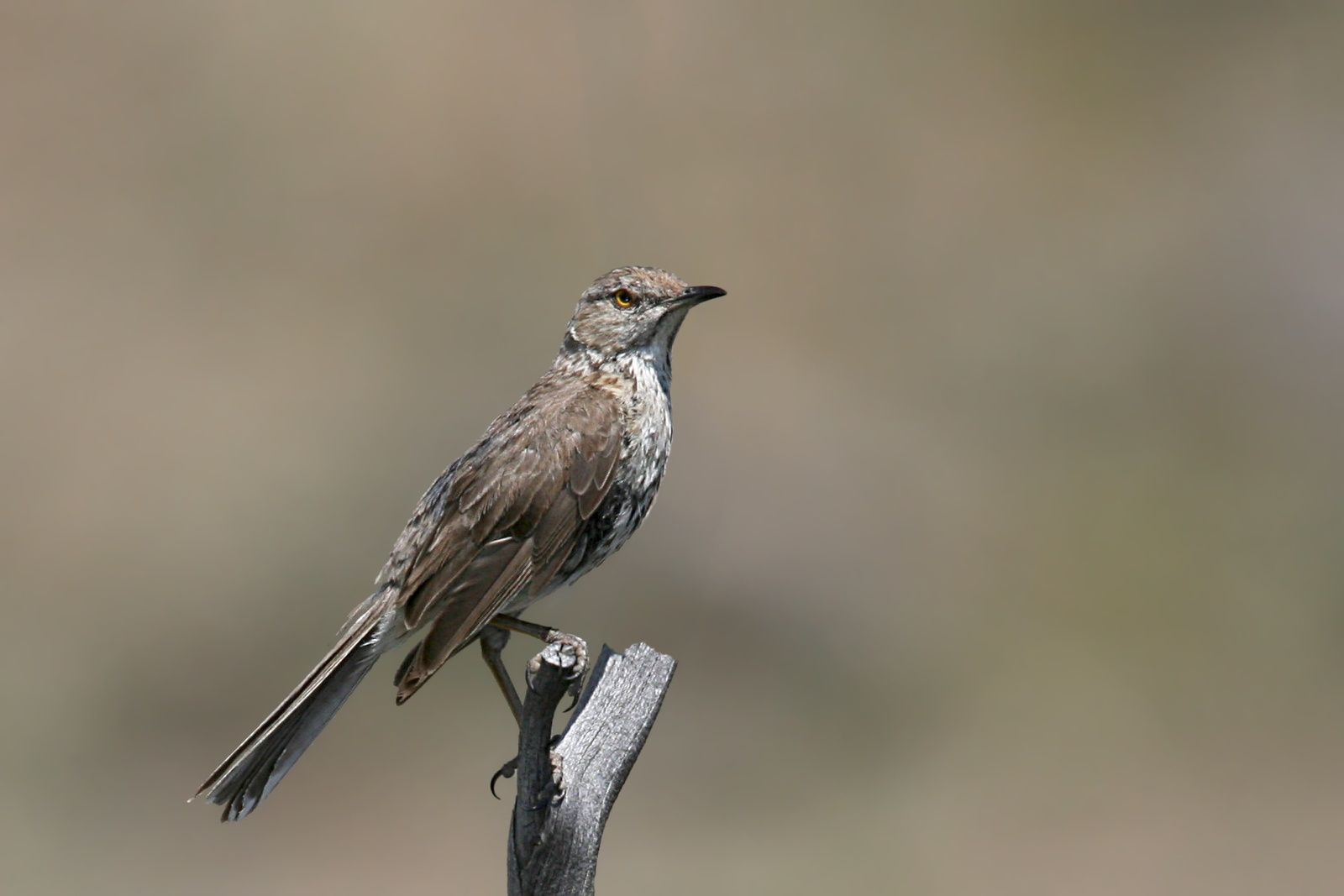
Sage thrasher

Order: Passeriformes Family: Mimidae

The mimids are a family of passerine birds which includes thrashers, mockingbirds, tremblers, and the New World catbirds. These birds are notable for their vocalization, especially their remarkable ability to mimic a wide variety of birds and other sounds heard outdoors. The species tend towards dull grays and browns in their appearance. Five species have been recorded in Wyoming.

- Gray catbird, Dumetella carolinensis
- Curve-billed thrasher, Toxostoma curvirostre (A)
- Brown thrasher, Toxostoma rufum
- Sage thrasher, Oreoscoptes montanus
- Northern mockingbird, Mimus polyglottos

== Starlings ==
Order: Passeriformes Family: Sturnidae

Starlings are small to medium-sized passerine birds. They are medium-sized passerines with strong feet. Their flight is strong and direct and they are very gregarious. Their preferred habitat is fairly open country, and they eat insects and fruit. Plumage is typically dark with a metallic sheen. One species has been recorded in Wyoming.

- European starling, Sturnus vulgaris (I)

== Dippers ==
Order: Passeriformes Family: Cinclidae

Dippers are small, stout, birds that feed in cold, fast moving streams. One species has been recorded in Wyoming.

- American dipper, Cinclus mexicanus

== Thrushes and allies ==
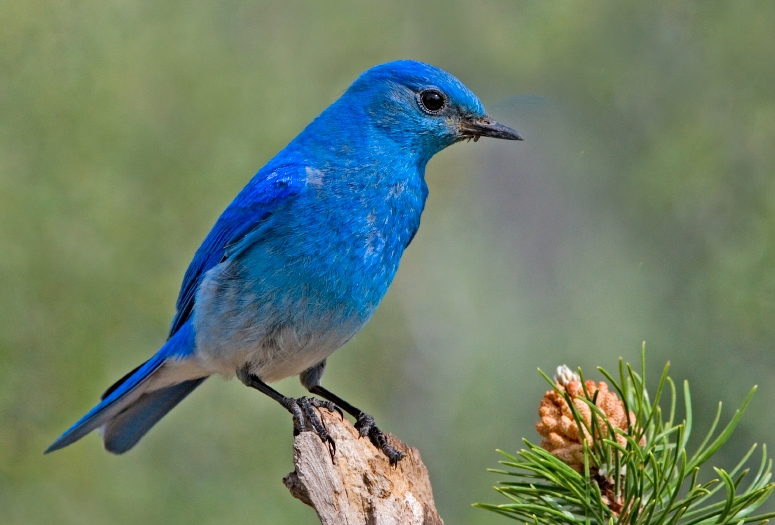
Mountain bluebird

Order: Passeriformes Family: Turdidae

The thrushes are a group of passerine birds that occur mainly but not exclusively in the Old World. They are plump, soft plumaged, small to medium-sized insectivores or sometimes omnivores, often feeding on the ground. Many have attractive songs. Eleven species have been recorded in Wyoming.

- Eastern bluebird, Sialia sialis
- Western bluebird, Sialia mexicana
- Mountain bluebird, Sialia currucoides
- Townsend's solitaire, Myadestes townsendi
- Veery, Catharus fuscescens
- Gray-cheeked thrush, Catharus minimus
- Swainson's thrush, Catharus ustulatus
- Hermit thrush, Catharus guttatus
- Wood thrush, Hylocichla mustelina
- American robin, Turdus migratorius
- Varied thrush, Ixoreus naevius

== Old World flycatchers ==
Order: Passeriformes Family: Muscicapidae

The Old World flycatchers are a large family of small passerine birds mostly restricted to the Old World. These are mainly small arboreal insectivores, many of which, as the name implies, take their prey on the wing. One species has been recorded in Wyoming.

- Red-flanked bluetail, Tarsiger cyanurus (A)

== Old World sparrows ==
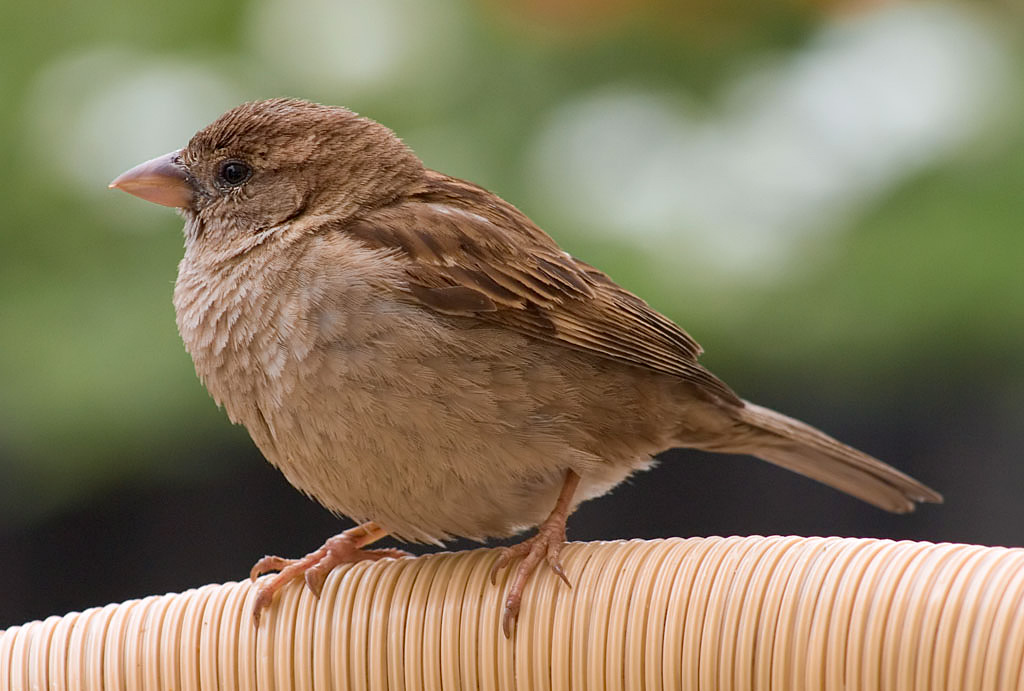
House sparrow

Order: Passeriformes Family: Passeridae

Old World sparrows are small passerine birds. In general, sparrows tend to be small plump brownish or grayish birds with short tails and short powerful beaks. Sparrows are seed eaters, but they also consume small insects. One species has been recorded in Wyoming.

- House sparrow, Passer domesticus (I)

== Wagtails and pipits ==
Order: Passeriformes Family: Motacillidae

Motacillidae is a family of small passerine birds with medium to long tails. They include the wagtails, longclaws, and pipits. They are slender ground-feeding insectivores of open country. Two species have been recorded in Wyoming.

- American pipit, Anthus rubescens
- Sprague's pipit, Anthus spragueii

== Finches, euphonias, and allies ==
Order: Passeriformes Family: Fringillidae

Finches are seed-eating passerine birds, that are small to moderately large and have a strong beak, usually conical and in some species very large. All have twelve tail feathers and nine primaries. These birds have a bouncing flight with alternating bouts of flapping and gliding on closed wings, and most sing well. Seventeen species have been recorded in Wyoming.

- Brambling, Fringilla montifringilla (A)
- Evening grosbeak, Coccothraustes vespertinus
- Pine grosbeak, Pinicola enucleator
- Gray-crowned rosy-finch, Leucosticte tephrocotis
- Black rosy-finch, Leucosticte atrata
- Brown-capped rosy-finch, Leucosticte australis
- House finch, Haemorhous mexicanus
- Purple finch, Haemorhous purpureus
- Cassin's finch, Haemorhous cassinii
- Common redpoll, Acanthis flammea
- Hoary redpoll, Acanthis hornemanni (A)
- Red crossbill, Loxia curvirostra
- Cassia crossbill, Loxia sinesciuris (A)
- White-winged crossbill, Loxia leucoptera
- Pine siskin, Spinus pinus
- Lesser goldfinch, Spinus psaltria
- Lawrence's goldfinch, Spinus lawrencei (A)
- American goldfinch, Spinus tristis

== Longspurs and snow buntings ==
Order: Passeriformes Family: Calcariidae

The Calcariidae are a group of passerine birds that were traditionally grouped with the New World sparrows, but differ in a number of respects and are usually found in open grassy areas. Five species have been recorded in Wyoming.

- Lapland longspur, Calcarius lapponicus
- Chestnut-collared longspur, Calcarius ornatus
- Smith's longspur, Calcarius pictus (A)
- Thick-billed longspur, Rhyncophanes mccownii
- Snow bunting, Plectrophenax nivalis

== New World sparrows ==
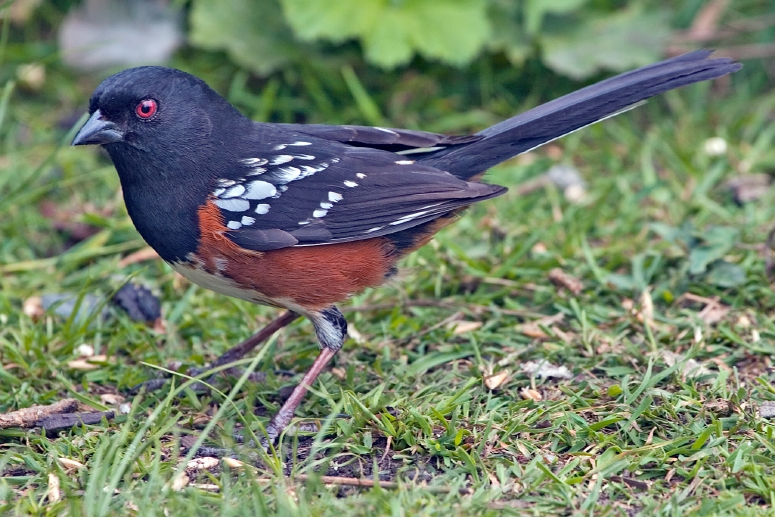
Spotted towhee

Order: Passeriformes Family: Passerellidae

Until 2017, these species were considered part of the family Emberizidae. Most of the species are known as sparrows, but these birds are not closely related to the Old World sparrows which are in the family Passeridae. Many of these have distinctive head patterns. Twenty-nine species have been recorded in Wyoming.

- Cassin's sparrow, Peucaea cassinii (A)
- Grasshopper sparrow, Ammodramus savannarum
- Black-throated sparrow, Amphispiza bilineata
- Lark sparrow, Chondestes grammacus
- Lark bunting, Calamospiza melanocorys
- Chipping sparrow, Spizella passerina
- Clay-colored sparrow, Spizella pallida
- Field sparrow, Spizella pusilla
- Brewer's sparrow, Spizella breweri
- Fox sparrow, Passerella iliaca
- American tree sparrow, Spizelloides arborea
- Dark-eyed junco, Junco hyemalis
- White-crowned sparrow, Zonotrichia leucophrys
- Golden-crowned sparrow, Zonotrichia atricapilla
- Harris's sparrow, Zonotrichia querula
- White-throated sparrow, Zonotrichia albicollis
- Sagebrush sparrow, Artemisiospiza nevadensis
- Vesper sparrow, Pooecetes gramineus
- LeConte's sparrow, Ammospiza leconteii
- Nelson's sparrow, Ammospiza nelsoni (A)
- Baird's sparrow, Centronyx bairdii
- Savannah sparrow, Passerculus sandwichensis
- Song sparrow, Melospiza melodia
- Lincoln's sparrow, Melospiza lincolnii
- Swamp sparrow, Melospiza georgiana
- Canyon towhee, Melozone fusca (A)
- Green-tailed towhee, Pipilo chlorurus
- Spotted towhee, Pipilo maculatus
- Eastern towhee, Pipilo erythrophthalmus (A)

== Yellow-breasted chat ==
Order: Passeriformes Family: Icteriidae

This species was historically placed in the wood-warblers (Parulidae) but nonetheless most authorities were unsure if it belonged there. It was placed in its own family in 2017.

- Yellow-breasted chat, Icteria virens

== Troupials and allies ==
Order: Passeriformes Family: Icteridae

The icterids are a group of small to medium-sized, often colorful passerine birds restricted to the New World and include the grackles, New World blackbirds, and New World orioles. Most species have black as a predominant plumage color, often enlivened by yellow, orange, or red. Thirteen species have been recorded in Wyoming.

- Yellow-headed blackbird, Xanthocephalus xanthocephalus
- Bobolink, Dolichonyx oryzivorus
- Eastern meadowlark, Sturnella magna (A)
- Western meadowlark, Sturnella neglecta
- Orchard oriole, Icterus spurius
- Bullock's oriole, Icterus bullockii
- Baltimore oriole, Icterus galbula
- Scott's oriole, Icterus parisorum
- Red-winged blackbird, Agelaius phoeniceus
- Brown-headed cowbird, Molothrus ater
- Rusty blackbird, Euphagus carolinus
- Brewer's blackbird, Euphagus cyanocephalus
- Common grackle, Quiscalus quiscula
- Great-tailed grackle, Quiscalus mexicanus (A)

== New World warblers ==
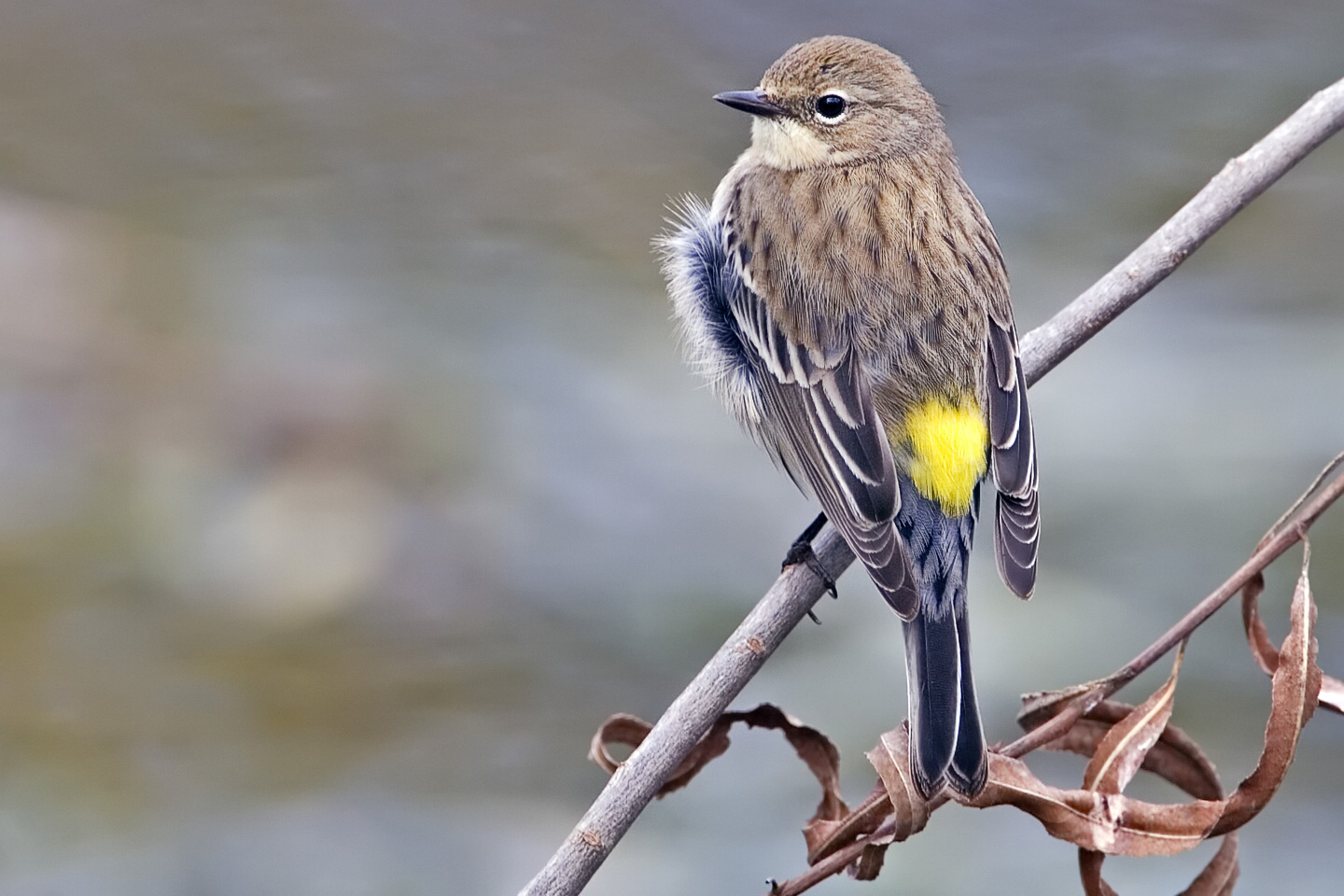
Yellow-rumped warbler

Order: Passeriformes Family: Parulidae

The wood-warblers are a group of small often colorful passerine birds restricted to the New World. Most are arboreal, but some like the ovenbird and the two waterthrushes, are more terrestrial. Most members of this family are insectivores. Thirty-nine species have been recorded in Wyoming.

- Ovenbird, Seiurus aurocapilla
- Worm-eating warbler, Helmitheros vermivorum
- Northern waterthrush, Parkesia noveboracensis
- Golden-winged warbler, Vermivora chrysoptera (A)
- Blue-winged warbler, Vermivora cyanoptera (A)
- Black-and-white warbler, Mniotilta varia
- Prothonotary warbler, Protonotaria citrea (A)
- Tennessee warbler, Leiothlypis peregrina
- Orange-crowned warbler, Leiothlypis celata
- Nashville warbler, Leiothlypis ruficapilla
- Virginia's warbler, Leiothlypis virginiae
- Connecticut warbler, Oporornis agilis (A)
- MacGillivray's warbler, Geothlypis tolmiei
- Mourning warbler, Geothlypis philadelphia (A)
- Kentucky warbler, Geothlypis formosa (A)
- Common yellowthroat, Geothlypis trichas
- Hooded warbler, Setophaga citrina (A)
- American redstart, Setophaga ruticilla
- Cape May warbler, Setophaga tigrina (A)
- Northern parula, Setophaga americana
- Magnolia warbler, Setophaga magnolia
- Bay-breasted warbler, Setophaga castanea
- Blackburnian warbler, Setophaga fusca
- Yellow warbler, Setophaga petechia
- Chestnut-sided warbler, Setophaga pensylvanica
- Blackpoll warbler, Setophaga striata
- Black-throated blue warbler, Setophaga caerulescens
- Palm warbler, Setophaga palmarum
- Pine warbler, Setophaga pinus (A)
- Yellow-rumped warbler, Setophaga coronata
- Yellow-throated warbler, Setophaga dominica (A)
- Prairie warbler, Setophaga discolor (A)
- Black-throated gray warbler, Setophaga nigrescens
- Townsend's warbler, Setophaga townsendi
- Hermit warbler, Setophaga occidentalis
- Black-throated green warbler, Setophaga virens (A)
- Canada warbler, Cardellina canadensis (A)
- Wilson's warbler, Cardellina pusilla
- Red-faced warbler, Cardellina rubrifrons (A)

== Cardinals and allies ==
Order: Passeriformes Family: Cardinalidae

The cardinals are a family of robust, seed-eating birds with strong bills. They are typically associated with open woodland. The sexes usually have distinct plumages. Thirteen species have been recorded in Wyoming.

- Hepatic tanager, Piranga flava (A)
- Summer tanager, Piranga rubra
- Scarlet tanager, Piranga olivacea (A)
- Western tanager, Piranga ludoviciana
- Northern cardinal, Cardinalis cardinalis
- Yellow grosbeak, Pheucticus chrysopeplus (A)
- Rose-breasted grosbeak, Pheucticus ludovicianus
- Black-headed grosbeak, Pheucticus melanocephalus
- Blue grosbeak, Passerina caerulea
- Lazuli bunting, Passerina amoena
- Indigo bunting, Passerina cyanea
- Painted bunting, Passerina ciris (A)
- Dickcissel, Spiza americana

== See also ==
- List of birds of Yellowstone National Park
- List of birds of Grand Teton National Park
- List of birds
- Lists of birds by region
- List of birds of North America
