= Asian rosy finch =

Conservation status
- Least Concern (IUCN 3.1)

Scientific classification
- Kingdom: Animalia
- Phylum: Chordata
- Class: Aves
- Order: Passeriformes
- Family: Fringillidae
- Subfamily: Carduelinae
- Genus: Leucosticte
- Species: L. arctoa

Binomial name
- Leucosticte arctoa (Pallas, 1811)

Species of bird

The Asian rosy finch or Asian rosy-finch (Leucosticte arctoa) is a species of finch in the family Fringillidae. It breeds in Mongolia and the East Palearctic; it winters in Manchuria, Korea, Sakhalin and Japan. Its natural habitats are tundra and temperate grassland.

== Taxonomy ==
Genetic studies show that the species is very closely related to the three American species Gray-crowned rosy finch, Black rosy finch, and Brown-capped rosy finch; the four of them were treated often as conspecific.

=== Subspecies ===
- L. a. arctoa – Russian Altai
- L. a. brunneonucha – Mountains of East Siberia (Lena River to Kamchatka and Kuril Islands)
- L. a. cognata – Sayan Mountains and adjacent mountains on Russia-Mongolia border
- L. a. gigliolii – Mountains north of Lake Baikal (east to Yablonovy mountains)
- L. a. sushkini – Northern Mongolia (Khangai region)

== Description ==
The Asian rosy finch is a stout, dark brown finch. Males across most of the species' range exhibit a distinctive appearance with black faces and throats, and wings and flanks suffused with a pinkish hue. However, the Yakutian subspecies deviates from this pattern, displaying deeper brown wings with no trace of pink. Females lack the pink coloration and present a paler appearance on the face and throat compared to males.

== Ecology ==
In summer, the bird is seen on rocky tundra or in mountainous areas above the tree line. It feeds mostly on seeds, buds and shoots, but also invertebrates. Its breeding biology is poorly known and few nests have been found. It breeds between June and August, in the coldest areas from July. It lays only one brood and breeds singly or in loose colonies. The species is both migratory, partly migratory and altitudinal.
