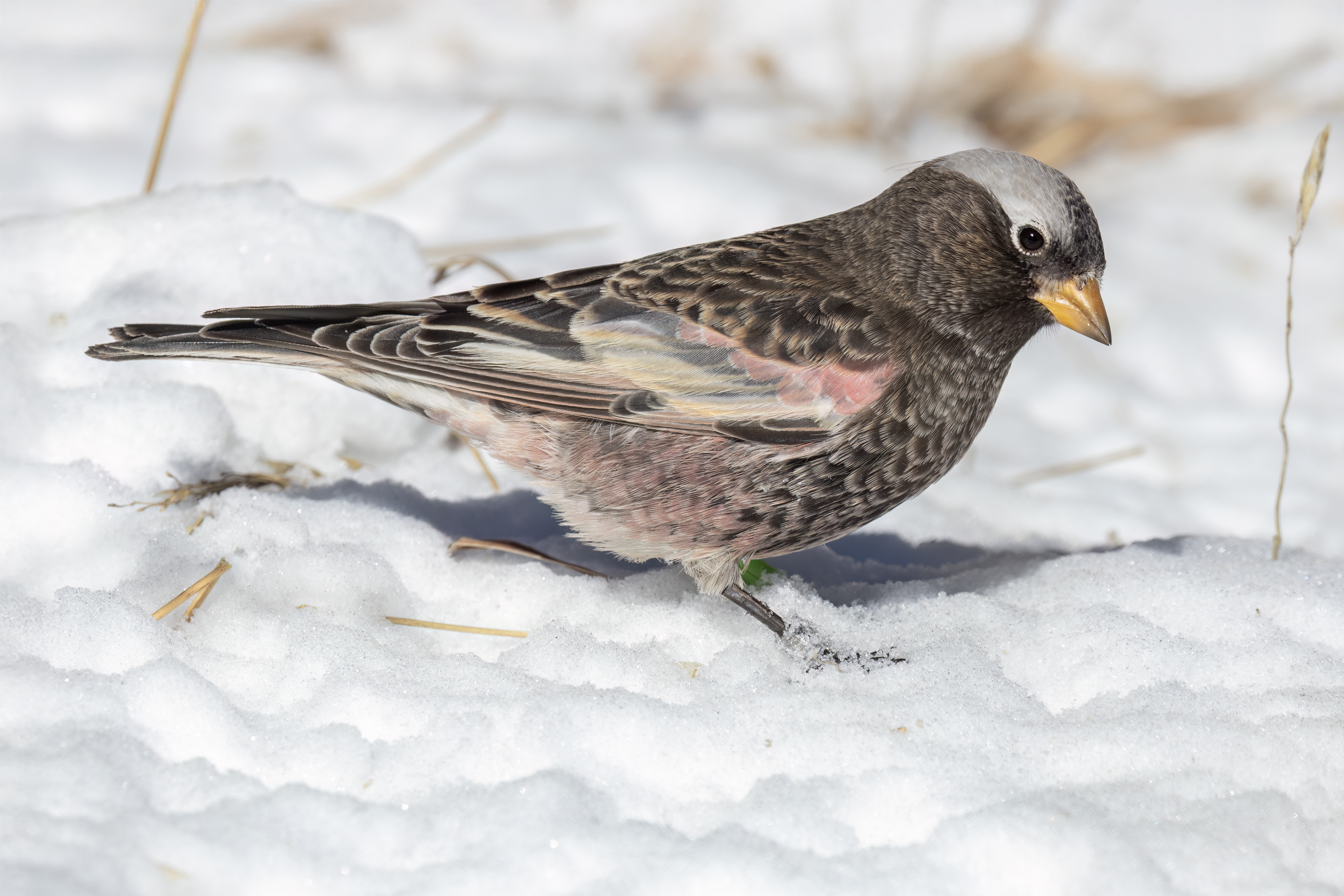
- Nonbreeding adult

Conservation status
- Endangered (IUCN 3.1)

Scientific classification
- Kingdom: Animalia
- Phylum: Chordata
- Class: Aves
- Order: Passeriformes
- Family: Fringillidae
- Subfamily: Carduelinae
- Genus: Leucosticte
- Species: L. atrata

Binomial name
- Leucosticte atrata Ridgway, 1874

= Black rosy finch =

Species of bird

The black rosy finch or black rosy-finch (Leucosticte atrata) is a species of passerine bird in the family Fringillidae native to alpine areas above treeline, of the western United States. It is the most range-restricted member of its genus, and a popular photography subject for birdwatchers.

== Taxonomy ==
The black rosy finch was first classified by American ornithologist Robert Ridgway in 1874. This bird has been thought to form a superspecies with the three other rosy finches: grey-crowned rosy finch (L. tephrocotis) and the brown-capped rosy finch (L. australis), all of which were classified as the same species as the Asian rosy finch (L. arctoa) from 1983–1993. Recent mitochondrial DNA evidence shows the rosy finches are all indeed very closely related and can be easily confused with one another. Along with four Asian rosy finches, the three North American rosy finches form the mountain finch genus Leucosticte. There are no recognized subspecies of the black rosy finch. Alternative common names include: roselin (in French), Rußschneegimpel (in German), and pinzón montano negro (in Spanish).

== Description ==
Adults are black on the head, back and breast with pink on the belly, rump and wings. There is a patch of grey at the back of the head. They have short black legs and a long forked tail. The grey-crowned rosy finch has a brown body instead of black and the brown-capped rosy finch and lacks the grey patch on the back of the head.

== Distribution and habitat ==
The black rosy finch's breeding habitat is mountain areas above the tree-line, amongst alpine rocks and cliffs. Because of this it is one of the least studied birds in North America. Its distribution range is between that of the grey-crowned rosy finch (L. tephrocotis), which is located to north and west, and the brown-capped rosy finch (L. australis), which is located to the south and east.

The paucity of definitive information about its breeding distribution lead the Wildlife Action Plan Joint Team of the Utah Division of Wildlife Resources to designate the finch a "species of greatest conservation need" in Utah.

== Behavior ==
The black rosy finch builds a cup nest in a cavity on a cliff. Most birds migrate short distances to lower elevations and further south and return to the alpine areas in April. These birds forage on the ground, may fly to catch insects in flight. They mainly eat seeds from weeds and grasses and insects, often in areas where snow is melting, uncovering food items and new plant shoots are growing. They often feed in small flocks, sometimes mixing with grey-crowned rosy finches. A male will defend its female's territory during breeding season, not just the nest but wherever she goes. This behavior is common with the rosy finches. When breeding both males and females develop throat pouches, known as gular pouches or gular skin, to carry food to their chicks, a trait seen in only one other North American genus, Pinicola. Due to their inaccessibility, actual black rosy finch nests had been reached by only three researchers as of 2002. The nests are made of grass and stems and lined with fine grass, hair, and feathers. They are known to use protected areas such as openings in cliffs, mine shafts, caves, and rafters. They eat seeds and insects, usually foraged from the ground, including snowfields. Their call is a buzz-sounding "chew".

== Gallery ==
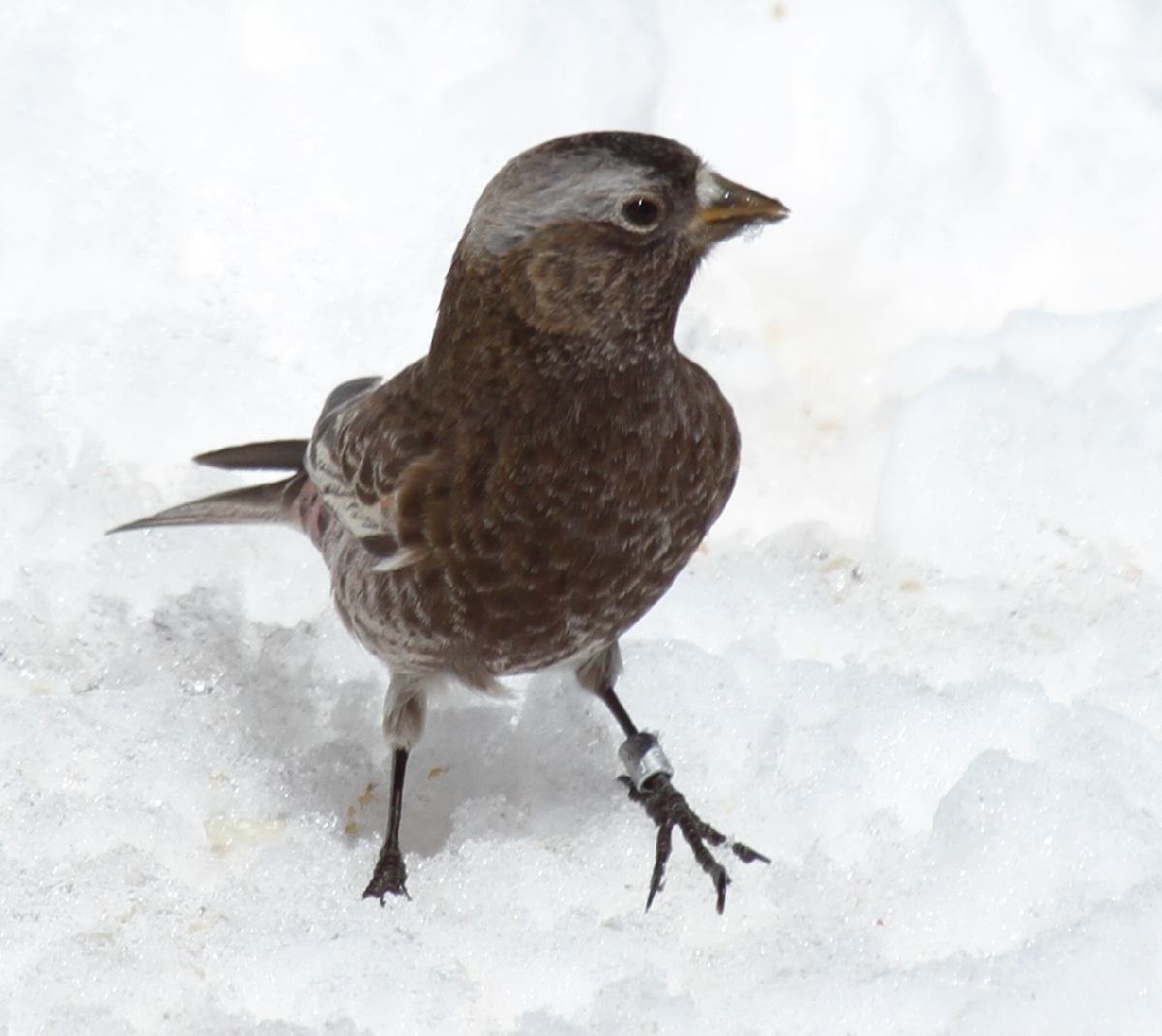
Sandia Peak - New Mexico

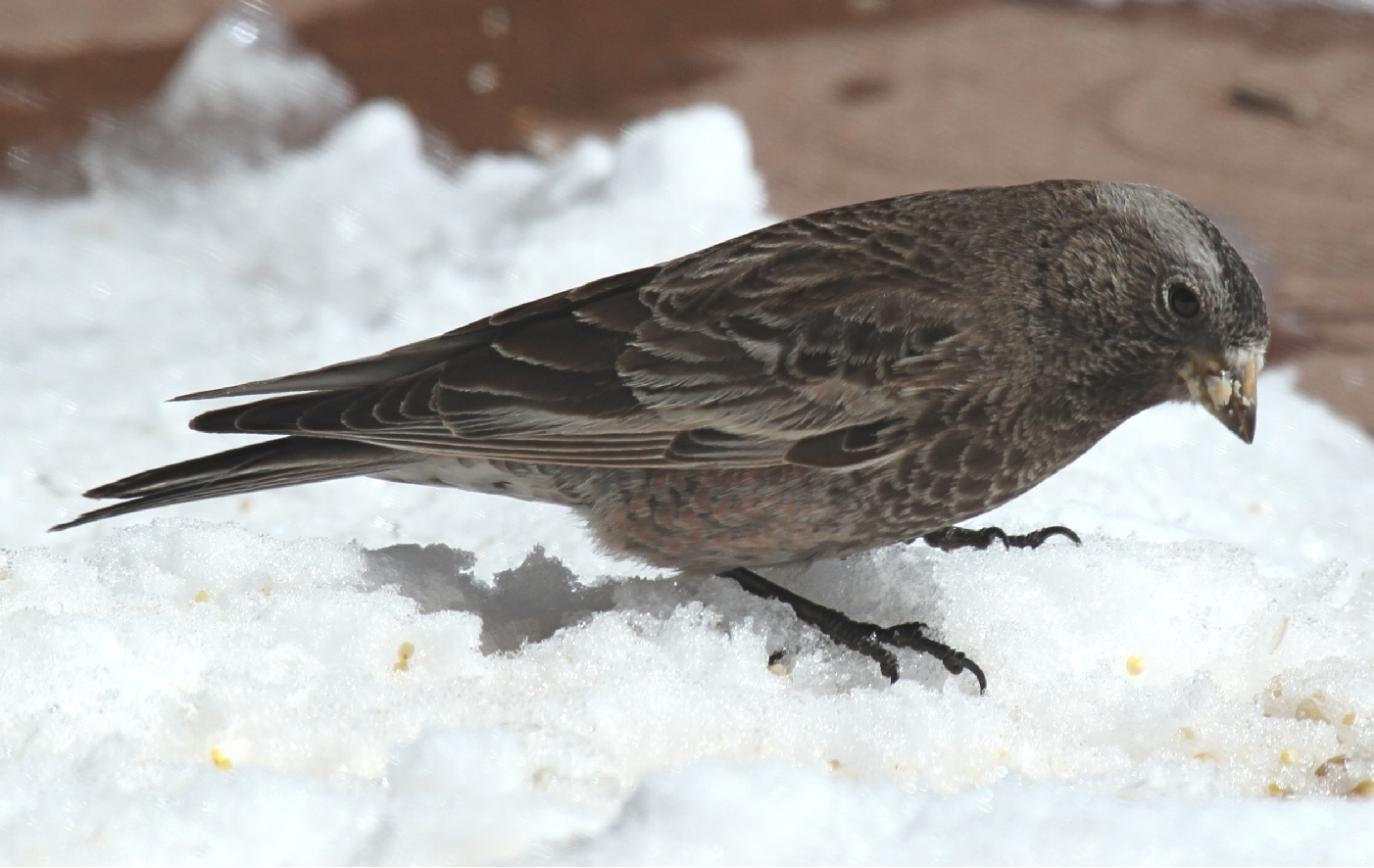
Sandia Peak - New Mexico
