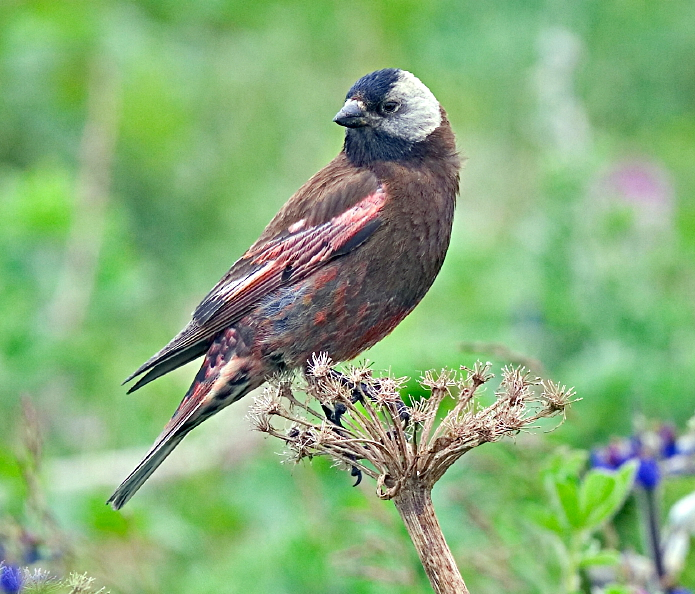
- Grey-crowned rosy finch (Leucosticte tephrocotis)

Scientific classification
- Kingdom: Animalia
- Phylum: Chordata
- Class: Aves
- Order: Passeriformes
- Family: Fringillidae
- Subfamily: Carduelinae
- Genus: Leucosticte; Swainson, 1832

Type species
- Linaria tephrocotis Swainson, 1832

Species
- See text.

= Mountain finch =

Mountain finches

Genus of birds

The mountain finches are birds in the genus Leucosticte from the true finch family, Fringillidae. This genus also includes the rosy finches, named from their pinkish plumage.

The genus is a sister to the monotypic Procarduelis containing the Asian dark-breasted rosefinch. These birds are native to Asia and North America and are typically found in barren mountainous regions. Many species eat more insect material than other finches.

There are six species in the genus:

Image	Scientific name	Common name	Distribution
	Leucosticte nemoricola	Plain mountain finch	Afghanistan, Bhutan, China, India, Kazakhstan, Myanmar, Nepal, Pakistan, Russia, Tajikistan, Tibet, and Turkmenistan.
	Leucosticte brandti	Brandt's mountain finch	Afghanistan, Bhutan, China, India, Kazakhstan, Nepal, Pakistan, Russia, Tajikistan, and Turkmenistan
	Leucosticte arctoa	Asian rosy finch	Mongolia and North Asia; it winters in Manchuria, Korea, Sakhalin and Japan
	Leucosticte tephrocotis	Gray-crowned rosy finch	Alaska, western Canada, and the north-western United States.
	Leucosticte atrata	Black rosy finch	Interior west
	Leucosticte australis	Brown-capped rosy finch	central Rocky Mountains of the United States
