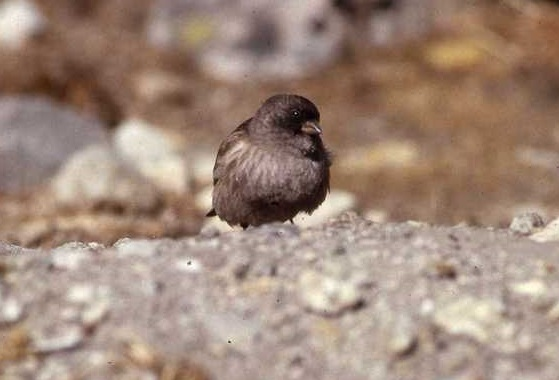

Conservation status
- Least Concern (IUCN 3.1)

Scientific classification
- Kingdom: Animalia
- Phylum: Chordata
- Class: Aves
- Order: Passeriformes
- Family: Fringillidae
- Subfamily: Carduelinae
- Genus: Leucosticte
- Species: L. brandti

Binomial name
- Leucosticte brandti Bonaparte, 1850

= Brandt's mountain finch =

Species of bird

Brandt's mountain finch (Leucosticte brandti), also known as the black-headed mountain-finch, is a species of finch in the family Fringillidae. It is found in Afghanistan, Bhutan, China, India, Kazakhstan, Nepal, Pakistan, Russia, Tajikistan, and Turkmenistan. Its natural habitat is temperate grassland.
