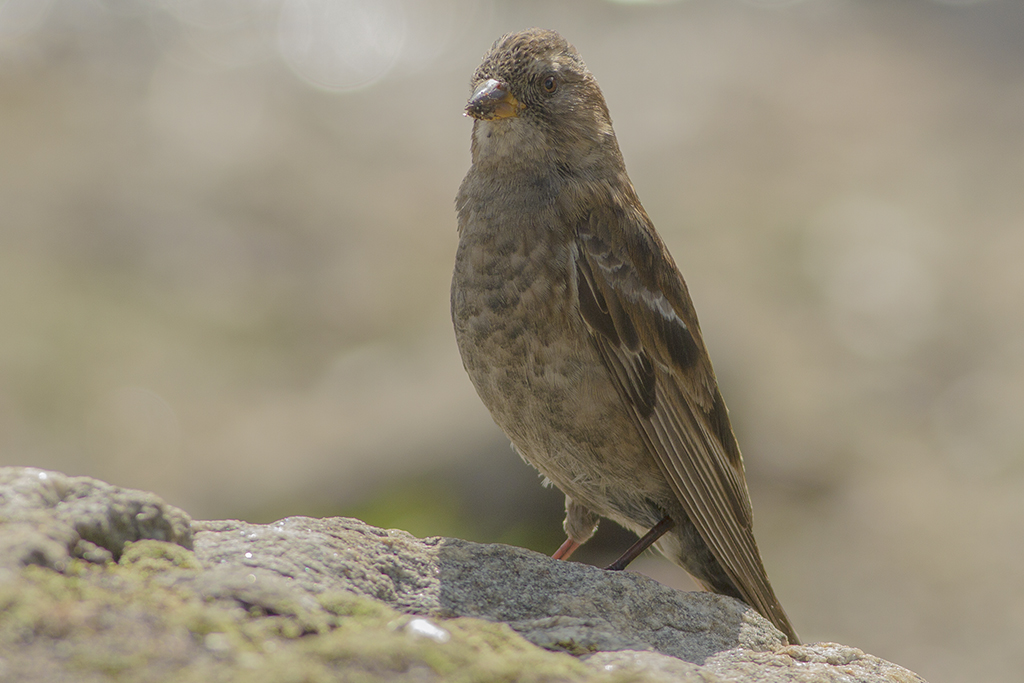
- Near Kupup(14000 ft), Sikkim, India. Subspecies nemoricola in breeding plumage.

Conservation status
- Least Concern (IUCN 3.1)

Scientific classification
- Kingdom: Animalia
- Phylum: Chordata
- Class: Aves
- Order: Passeriformes
- Family: Fringillidae
- Subfamily: Carduelinae
- Genus: Leucosticte
- Species: L. nemoricola

Binomial name
- Leucosticte nemoricola (Hodgson, 1836)

Synonyms
- Fringillauda nemoricola

= Plain mountain finch =

Species of bird

The plain mountain finch (Leucosticte nemoricola) is a species of finch in the family Fringillidae. Its natural habitat is temperate grassland, upland forest and rocky cliffs. It is a resident breeder across the Himalayas. Their color and patterns resemble house sparrows.

== Taxonomy ==
The plain mountain Finch is from the domain Eukaryote, the class Aves, the phylum Chordata and the order Passeriformes. They are from the family Fringillidae. The birds are a part of the genus Leucosticte and from the species nemoricola.

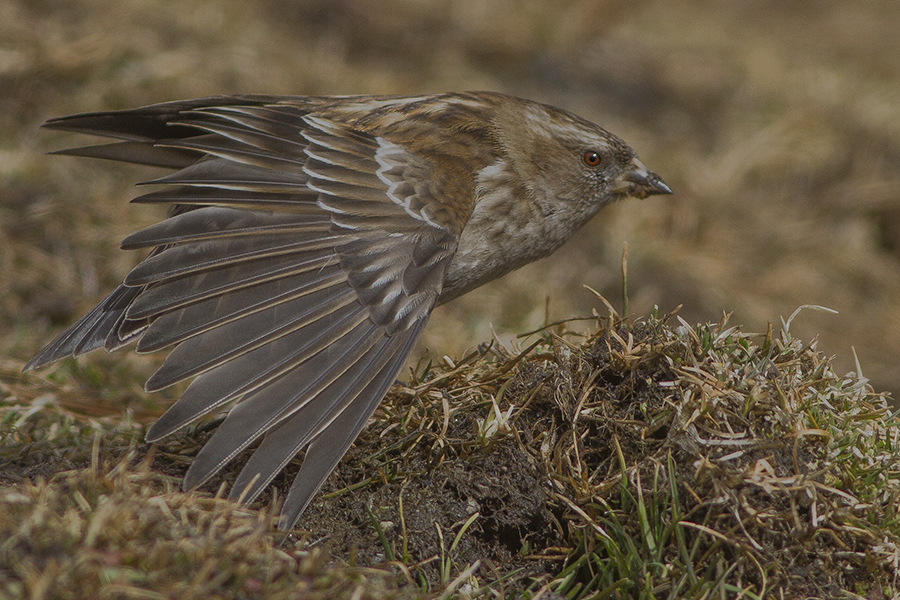
Showing wing pattern of Primaries, alula, secondaries, median coverts etc. Photographed from East Sikkim, India.

== Description ==
The Plain Mountain Finch is 14–15 centimetres (5.5–5.9 in) long, weighs 18–25 grams (0.63–0.88 oz), and has a slender build with long wings, a notched tail, and a short pointed bill. It features a buff brown head with tawny streaks, a beige neck, and pale brown around the eye and cheek. Its Mantle and back is dark brown with pale streaks, while its lower back is pale gray. The tail and wings are dark brown with buff-brown and white markings. Both males and females look alike, while juveniles are paler with less distinct markings.

== Habitat and Distribution ==
The Plain Mountain Finch is found in Afghanistan, Bhutan, China, India, Kazakhstan, Myanmar, Nepal, Pakistan, Russia, Tajikistan, Tibet, and Turkmenistan. During the non-breeding season, they are found in high valleys, mountain forests, rocky cliff sides, fields and in towns. Plain Mountain Finches are occasionally found as high as 5,300 metres (17,400 ft) in elevation, though they are more typically seen around 2,000 metres (6,600 ft), and are occasionally forced down to 450–750 metres (1,480–2,460 ft) by severe weather. Plain Mountain Finches can be both residents and altitudinal migrants.

== Behavior and Ecology ==
Plain Mountain Finches usually sing from rocky outcroppings and boulders. They have several different songs including sharper twittering, "trit-tit-tit-tit", "rick-pi-vitt" or "dui-dip-dip-dip". These songs can be mixed with sweeter, warbling, musical notes. While in flight and in flocks they make a loud and dry "tchit-ti-tit" or a softer "chi-chi-chi-chi". The Plain Mountain Finches diet consists of seeds from grasses, alpine herbs as well as small invertebrates. A nestlings diet is a mixture of plant and animal food. These finches are foragers and often desensitized to people. They are known to take scraps of human food from encampments. While the Plain mountain finch can be seen alone they are usually in small flocks. However, during the non-breeding season they gather in large flocks of 200-1000 birds. When looking for a breeding partner, the displaying male will attract females by holding both of his wings straight up, above his head. He will then run toward watching females while giving excited calls. Female Plain Mountain Finches usually build nests in rocky holes and crevices around 2m above ground and occasionally make their nests below ground in rodent burrows. Their nests consist of a shallow weaving of leaves, grasses, plant fibers, moss, roots, hair and feathers. A females clutch contains 3-6 eggs. These eggs are pure white or a pale, pinkish tint. The female incubates the eggs while the male feeds her in the nest for a period of 13-15 days. After hatching, both parents care for and feed their chicks. Common predators for these chicks include foxes, dogs, stoats, copperhead snakes and large snails. Predators for adults include the former as well as birds of prey.

== Population Trends ==
As of 2021 the Plain Mountain Finch is not globally threatened. As of 2024 the population size is unknown and the population trend is stable.
