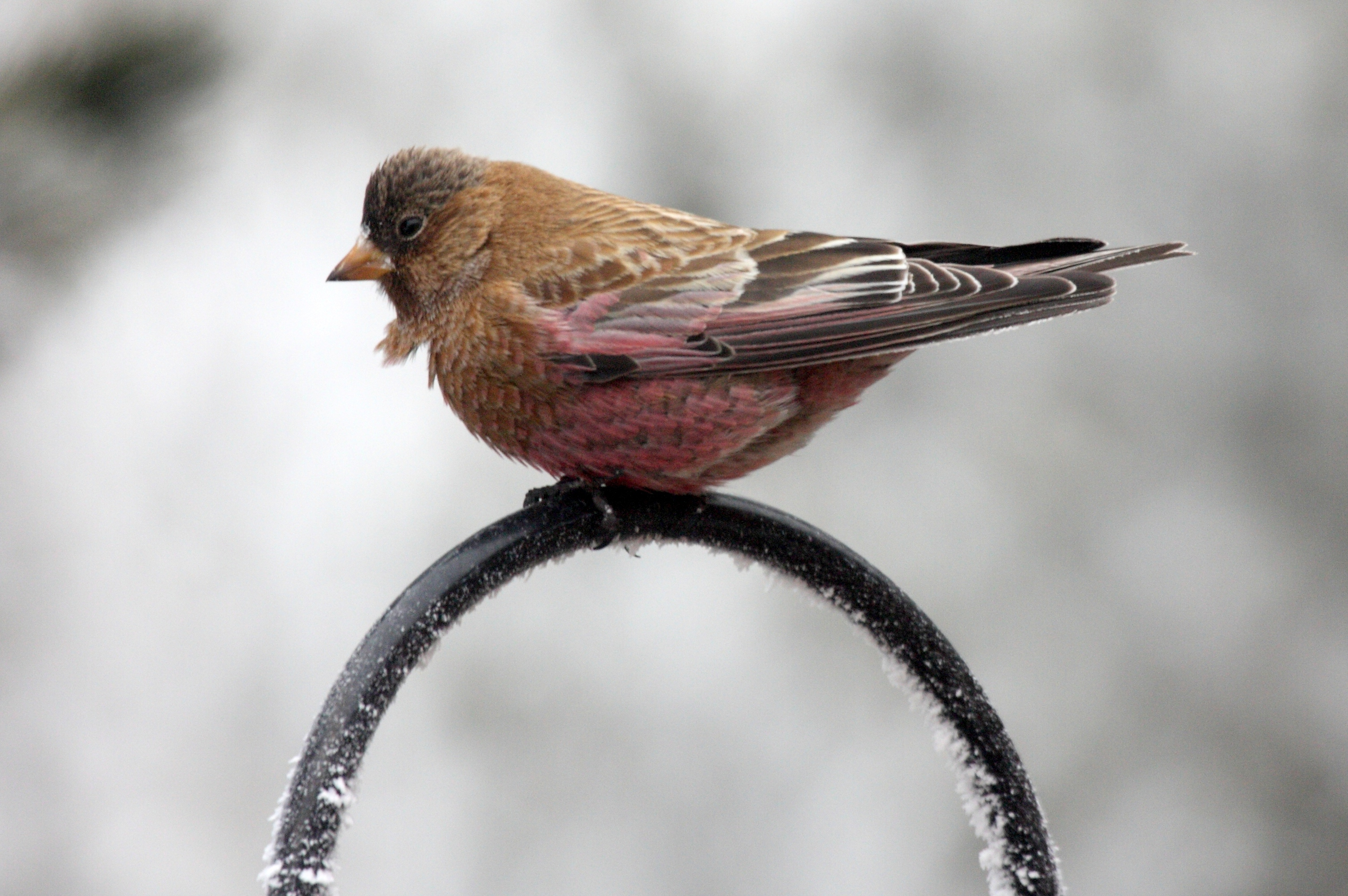

Conservation status
- Endangered (IUCN 3.1)

Scientific classification
- Kingdom: Animalia
- Phylum: Chordata
- Class: Aves
- Order: Passeriformes
- Family: Fringillidae
- Subfamily: Carduelinae
- Genus: Leucosticte
- Species: L. australis

Binomial name
- Leucosticte australis Ridgway, 1874
- blue: breeding; yellow: wintering

= Brown-capped rosy finch =

Species of bird

The brown-capped rosy finch (Leucosticte australis) is a medium-sized finch endemic to North America in the middle of the Rocky Mountains.

Adults are brown on the head, back, and breast. The belly and rump are pink, with additional pink shading on the wings and tail. The pink is pronounced on the male but more subdued on the female. The forehead is black or grayish brown. The bill is yellow in winter and black in summer. These birds have short black legs and a long forked tail.

Their breeding habitat is mountain peaks in the central Rocky Mountains of the United States. They build a cup nest in a cavity on a cliff, or re-use abandoned cliff swallow nests. In winter, these birds migrate short distances to lower elevations. After breeding, the female takes three days to finish the nest.

These birds can be found in alpine snowfields and also at feeders, especially in the winter. They forage on the ground, but may fly to catch insects in flight. They mainly eat seeds from weeds and grasses and insects. They often feed in small flocks with other rosy finches.

At one time, the three North American rosy finches were considered to be one species.

Despite fears that the population of this bird is declining, an analysis published in 2023 found a healthy population with more than three times the birds estimated in a 2016 report.

== Gallery ==
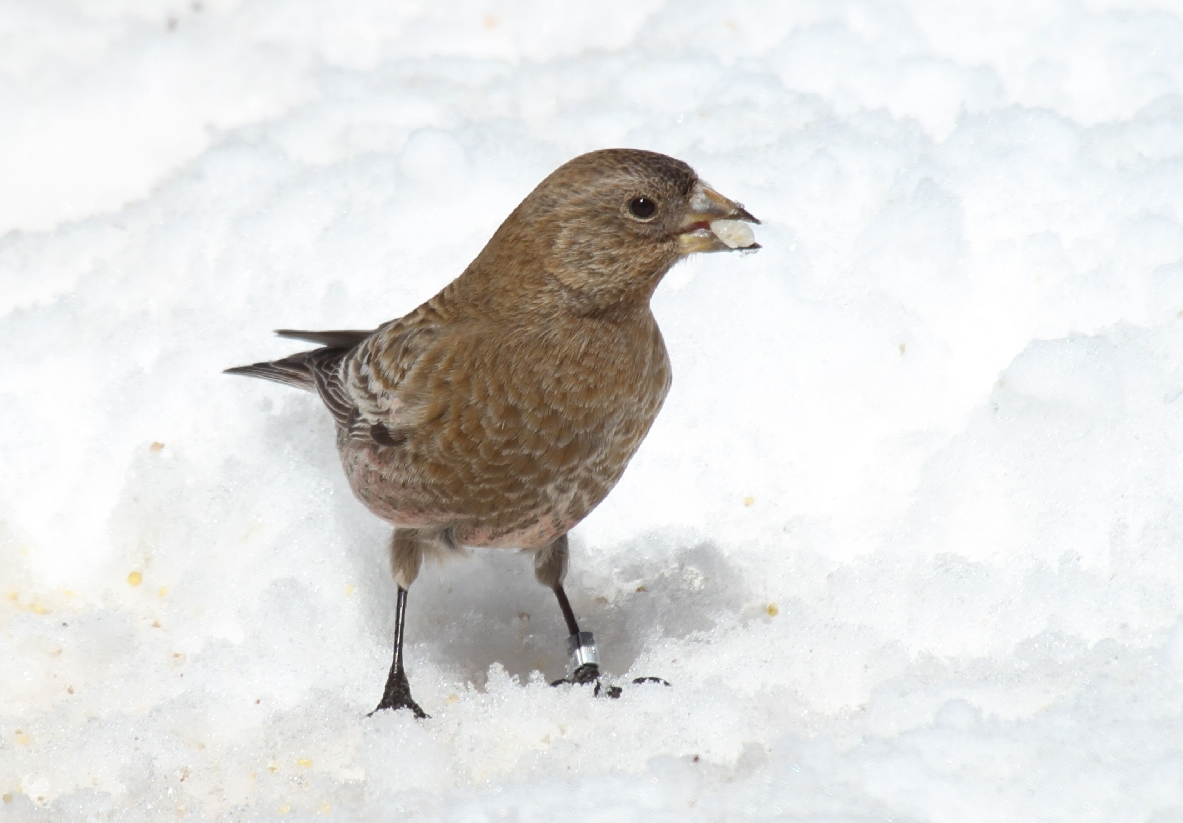
Sandia Peak - New Mexico
