= Anderson Lake =

Anderson Lake may refer to:

== Canada ==
- Anderson Lake (British Columbia)
- Anderson Lake (Nova Scotia)
- Anderson Lake (Upper Hammonds Plains), Nova Scotia
- Anderson Lake, in Mulock Township, Ontario
- Anderson Lake (Vancouver Island)
- Anderson Lake (Saskatchewan)

== United States ==
- Anderson Lake (Cross County, Arkansas), a lake of Cross County, Arkansas
- Anderson Lake (Lee County, Arkansas), a lake of Lee County, Arkansas
- Anderson Lake (California)
- Anderson Lake (Georgia), on Georgia State Route 166
- Anderson Lake (Illinois)
- Anderson Goose Lake, Iowa, also known as "Anderson Lake"
- Anderson Lake (Poplar River), Minnesota
- Anderson Lake (South Dakota)
- Anderson Lake (Alpine Lakes Wilderness), King County, Washington
- Anderson Lake (Jefferson County, Washington)
  - Anderson Lake State Park
- Anderson Lakes (Minnesota), see Bush Lake (Hennepin County, Minnesota)

== See also ==
- Anderson Lake State Park
- Anderson Lake State Fish and Wildlife Area
