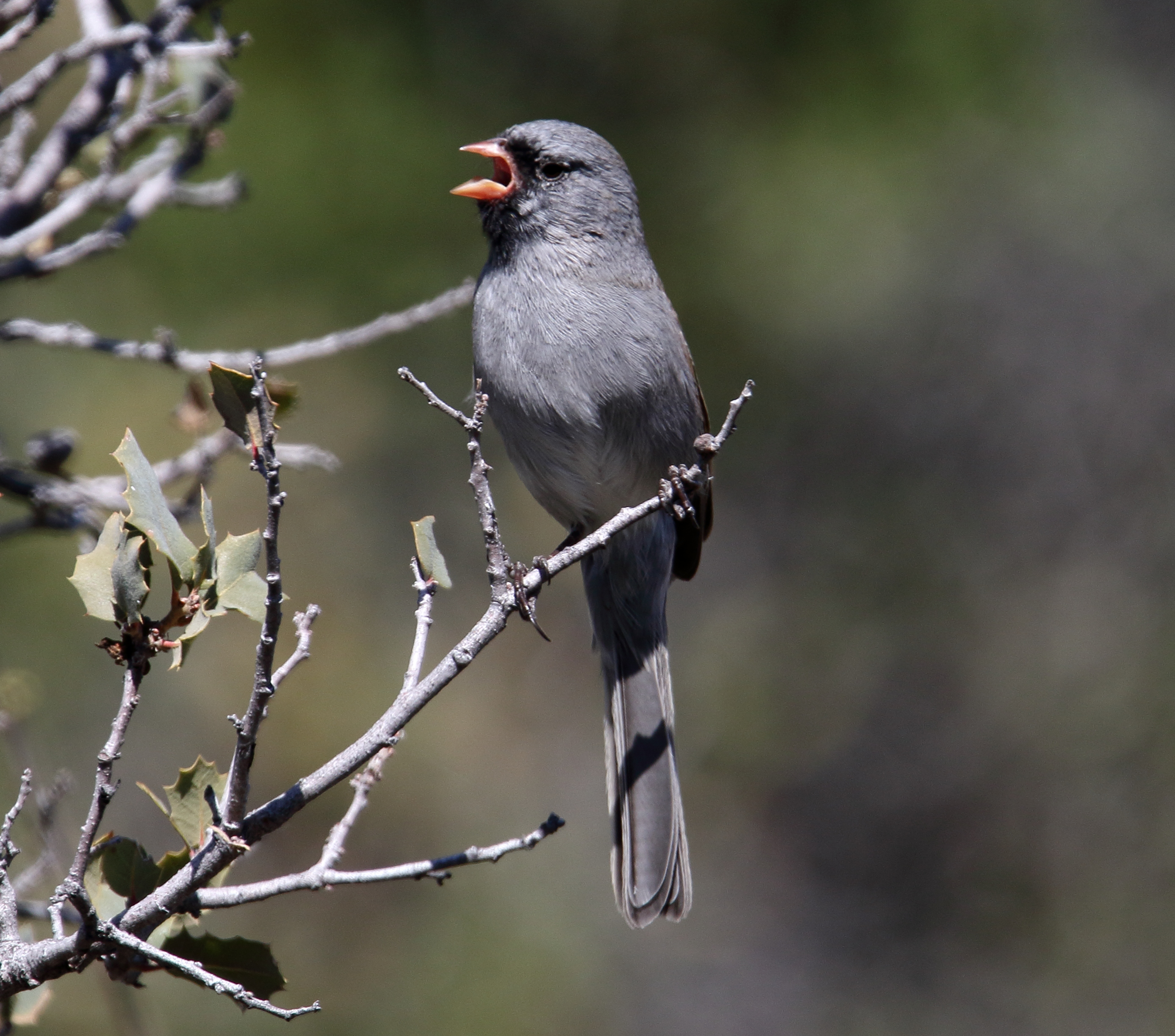
- Breeding male

Conservation status
- Least Concern (IUCN 3.1)

Scientific classification
- Kingdom: Animalia
- Phylum: Chordata
- Class: Aves
- Order: Passeriformes
- Family: Passerellidae
- Genus: Spizella
- Species: S. atrogularis

Binomial name
- Spizella atrogularis (Cabanis, 1851)
- Range of black-chinned sparrow Breeding Non-Breeding Year-round Migration

Synonyms
- Spinites atrogularis Cabanis, 1851; Struthus atrimentalis Couch, 1854; Spizella evura Coues, 1866; Spizella atrigularis Salvin & Godman, 1886

= Black-chinned sparrow =

Species of bird

The black-chinned sparrow (Spizella atrogularis) is a small bird in the genus Spizella, in the New World sparrow family Passerellidae. It is found in the southwestern United States and throughout much of Mexico north of the Isthmus of Tehuantepec; most populations in the US migrate south after breeding while those in Mexico are resident. It is a slim, long-tailed bird, primarily gray with a reddish-brown back streaked with black, brown wings and tail, a pink beak, and brownish legs and feet. In the breeding season, the male shows black on his throat, chin, and the front of his face. Females, youngsters and nonbreeding males show little or no black in these areas. An unobtrusive bird, it spends much of its time foraging slowly along the ground, either alone or in small groups, sometimes mixing with other Spizella species. It is an omnivore, feeding primarily on seeds during the winter and insects during the summer. It builds a cup-shaped nest of grasses, rootlets, or plant fibers, into which the female lays 2–5 pale blue eggs. The female does most or all of the egg incubation, but both parents feed the hatched nestlings.

The species was first described by Jean Louis Cabanis in 1851. Four subspecies have been identified: one breeds only in the US, one only in Mexico, and the other two breed in both countries. Most northern populations move south—primarily into Mexico—for the winter. Because of its apparently large population size and very large range, it is considered to be a species of least concern. However, increasing global temperatures could have a significantly negative impact on its numbers.

== Taxonomy ==
German ornithologist Jean Louis Cabanis first described the black-chinned sparrow in 1851, using a specimen which is thought to have been collected near Mexico City. He called it Spinites atrogularis. Within the decade, most authorities had moved it to the genus Spizella, where it has remained since. It is one of six small New World sparrows in the genus, and is known to have hybridized with Brewer's sparrow, a congener. Mitochondrial DNA studies have shown that the field sparrow is its closest relative. There are four recognized subspecies:

- S. a. evura, first described by Elliott Coues in 1866, is found in the southwestern United States and northwestern Mexico (northern Sonora). Also known as the Arizona black-chinned sparrow, it has been considered a distinct species (Spizella evura) by some authors (Coues and Richard Bowdler Sharpe, for instance) in the past.
- S. a. caurina, first described by Alden H. Miller in 1929, is found in west-central California. This subspecies is also known as the San Francisco black-chinned sparrow.
- S. a. cana, first described by Coues in 1866, is found in southwestern California, and Baja California in northwestern Mexico. Also known as the California black-chinned sparrow, it has been considered by some in the past (Sharpe, for example) as a distinct species.
- S. a. atrogularis, the nominate subspecies, was described by Cabanis in 1851. It is found in north-central Mexico, and is also known as the Mexican black-chinned sparrow.

The genus name Spizella is a diminutive of the Ancient Greek word spiza, meaning "finch". The species name atrogularis is a combination of the Latin ater, meaning "black" and gularis, meaning "-throated" (from gula, meaning "throat"). The common name "sparrow" is an English word which was in use prior to the 12th century. Though originally used for the house sparrow, a common European species, its usage expanded to the unrelated New World sparrows because of their similar appearance.

== Description ==
The black-chinned sparrow is a small passerine, measuring 5 to 5 3/4 in. (13–15 cm) in length, with a wingspan of roughly 7 3/4 in. (19–20 cm). It weighs 0.3–0.5 oz (9.0–14.8 g), with a median weight of 0.4 oz (11.3 g). Overall, it is a slender, round-headed bird, with a high crown and a long, notched tail, which is proportionately longer than that of other Spizella sparrows. The sexes are similar, though the male averages slightly larger. The adult's head and body are gray, and its back is reddish-brown with black streaks. It has a "poorly defined" whitish belly, and its rump and uppertail coverts are an unstreaked gray. The feathers in its wings and tail are dark brown with paler edges (white in the tail). In alternate plumage (during the breeding season), the male has extensive black on its chin, throat and the front of its face. It loses most or all of this black during the nonbreeding season; the oldest males may retain some black flecking. The female has little or no black on her face, chin, or throat at any point during the year. In basic plumage, males and females can be difficult to tell apart. The juvenile resembles a nonbreeding adult, but shows indistinct streaking on its underparts, and two faint wingbars. The head and underparts have a brownish wash, and its outer scapulars are tawny-colored. The legs and feet are dark brown or dusky, and the bill is small, stout, and pink. Recent fledglings may have darker bills, as well as notably short tails, yellow gapes, and paler gray heads.

=== Voice ===
Its call is a high, soft tsip or stip. In flight it gives a soft ssip, a call said to resemble that of the chipping sparrow. The song is a series of clear, high-pitched whistles that accelerate into a rapid trill, which typically rises in pitch. Though similar to the song of the field sparrow, it is higher-pitched and more "mechanical". The accelerating trill is said to sound like a dropped ping pong ball.

=== Similar species ===
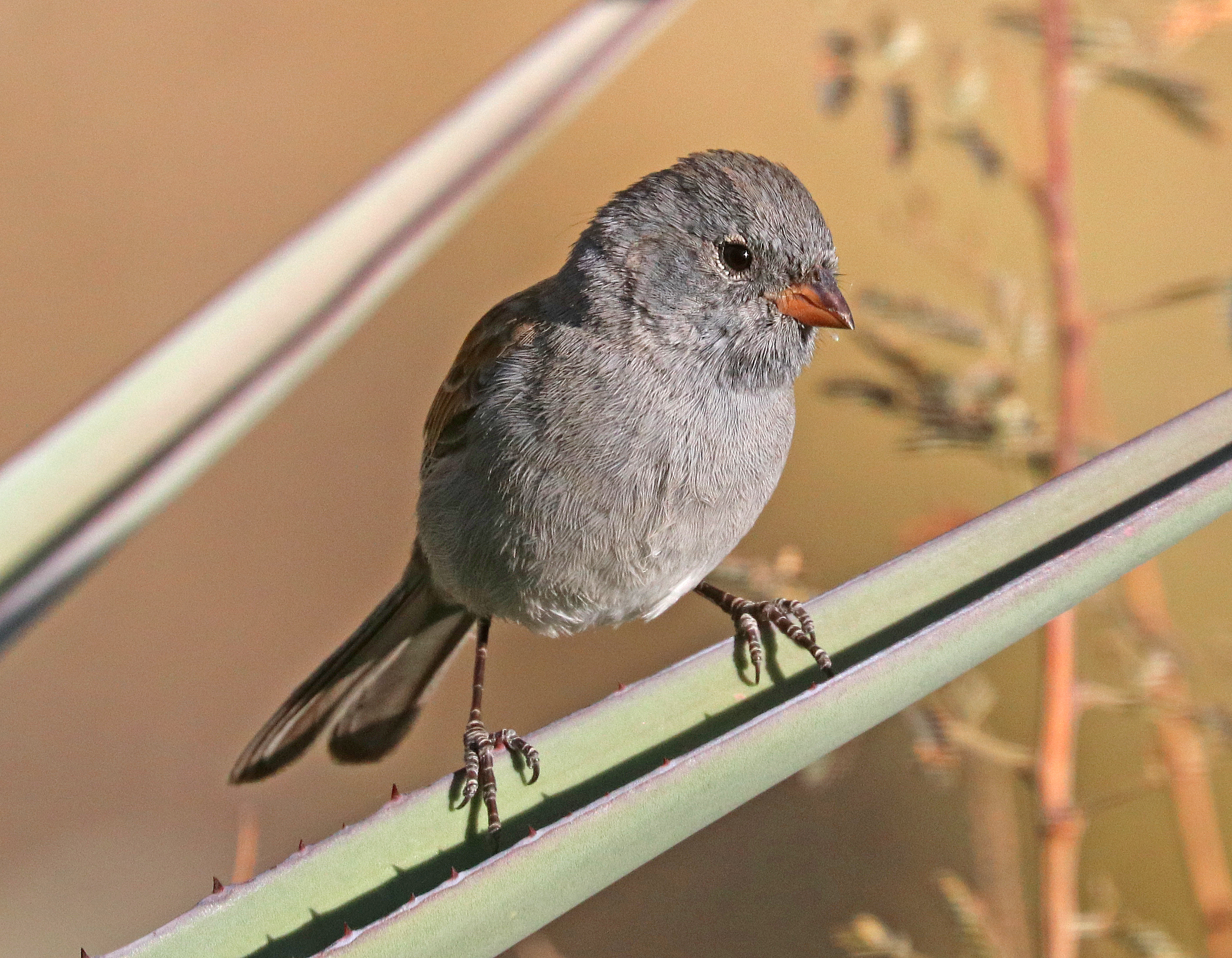
Females, youngsters, and nonbreeding males show few or no black markings on the head, chin and throat.

The combination of gray head and body is unique among New World sparrows. Though similar in plumage to the dark-eyed junco, the black-chinned sparrow is slimmer, and has a streaked back, brown edges to its wing feathers, and no white in its tail.

== Range and habitat ==
The black-chinned sparrow breeds in the southwestern United States and throughout much of Mexico north of the Isthmus of Tehuantepec. It is regularly found from northern California east to western Texas, and as far north as southern Nevada and Utah, and has occurred as a vagrant or occasional breeder in Oregon and Colorado. A species of arid and semi-arid places, it lives in chaparral, sagebrush, pine-juniper woodlands, and other brushy shrubland. Much of its habitat is in remote, rugged, and rocky areas. It is significantly less common in edge habitat, and rare near the coast. It is found at elevations ranging from near sea level to 2,400 m (8,000 ft) in the United States, and from 300 to 2,500 m (980 to 8,200 ft) in Mexico. Some birds in Utah may move into desert ecotones as part of a post-breeding dispersal and some northern populations move into Chihuahuan Desert scrub during the winter. Most northern populations move south – primarily into Mexico – during the winter; some move to lower elevations as well. During migration, it is sometimes recorded in montane oak forest, but not in mixed pine-oak forest.

== Behavior ==
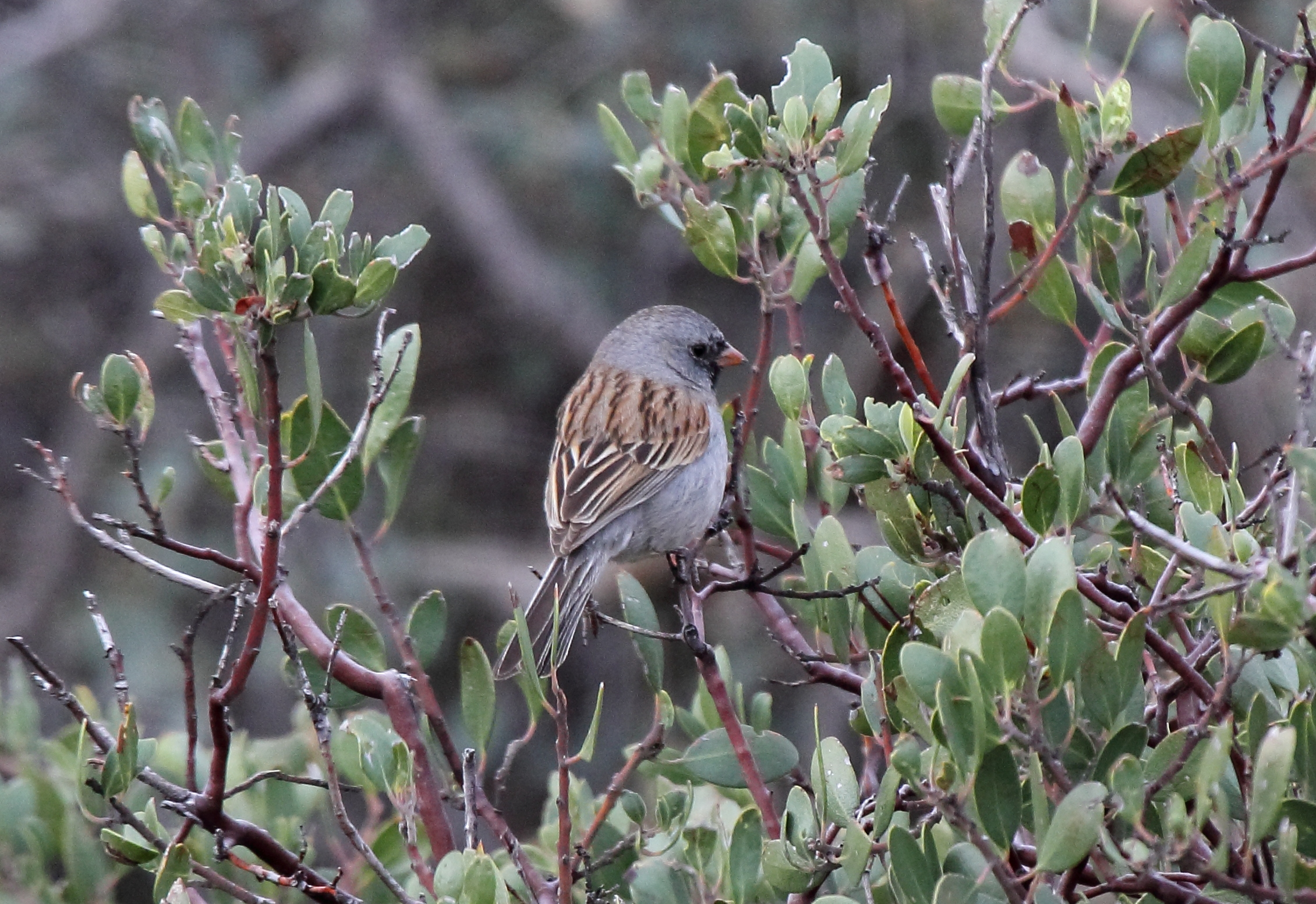
Dense, brushy cover is preferred habitat.

Although the black-chinned sparrow appears to be relatively common where it occurs, it is an inconspicuous species that can be easy to overlook. In Mexico, it is generally found singly or in pairs, and only rarely in small groups. In the United States, it is sometimes found in small, loose groups, occasionally mingling with Brewer's or chipping sparrows. It flies close to the ground, with an undulating flight style. Though the species often remains in deep cover, breeding males defy that more typical behavior and pick conspicuous, exposed perches from which to sing.

=== Feeding ===
The black-chinned sparrow forages on or near the ground, spending considerable time working in the same area. Though its diet is not well-known, it appears to feed primarily on seeds as a ground-gleaning granivore in the winter, and on insects as a ground-foraging omnivore in the summer. It occasionally captures insects in flight, and may feed on seeds while perched in a bush. It appears to obtain all of the moisture it needs from its food during the summer, but in the winter may travel a considerable distance to reach a water source.

=== Breeding ===
Much of the breeding ecology of the black-chinned sparrow is poorly known. It breeds primarily from late April into June, though active nests have been found as late as the middle of July. Males sing from open perches within their territory, which may encompass as much as 2 hectares (4.9 acres). Neighboring males often counter-sing, alternately responding to their singing rivals. They also aggressively chase each other. The nest is a shallow, open cup built of plant material, including grasses, weed stems, rootlets, or yucca fibers. This is lined with fibers or fine grasses, and occasionally with hair or feathers. It is located within 4 ft (1.2 m) of the ground, typically at mid-level in a dense shrub. The female does the bulk of the nest building, though the male may help. The nest is occasionally parasitized by cowbirds.

The female lays 2–5 very pale blue or bluish-green eggs. These are typically unmarked, though occasionally speckled with brown spots. Incubation takes roughly 13 days, and is done primarily (or possibly completely) by the female. The young are altricial – featherless with eyes closed upon hatching. Both parents provide food for the nestlings and remove fecal sacs for the 11–13 days it takes for the young to fledge. Adults continue to feed the fledglings for several weeks after they leave the nest. Most pairs raise a single brood per year, though there are records of a few pairs attempting multiple broods in southern California. Pairs stay together only for the length of breeding season. Nests suffer a high rate of failure; in one study in southern California, fewer than 30 percent of nesting attempts were successful. Most eggs and young are lost to predators. Garter snakes are known nest predators. Other suspected nest predators include western scrub jays, snakes, lizards, rodents, and ants.

== Conservation and threats ==
The black-chinned sparrow is one of the species protected by the Migratory Bird Treaty Act. Its overall population has not been quantified, but its numbers are known to be decreasing. Estimates of its global population range from 450,000 to 1,100,000. The North American Breeding Bird Survey shows that the black-chinned sparrow's numbers declined at an average rate of 5.1 percent annually between 1966 and 2003, while Partners in Flight reports that the sparrow's numbers dropped 62 percent between 1970 and 2014. However, it is known to be poorly sampled by breeding bird surveys in several states, including New Mexico and Texas. It is considered to be a "Bird of Conservation Concern" by the US Fish and Wildlife Service. On the other hand, the International Union for Conservation of Nature considers it to be a species of least concern, due to its substantial population and very large range.

The black-chinned sparrow is known to carry several blood parasites, including members of the genera Haemoproteus and Trypanosoma. Specimens carrying West Nile virus have been found dead. Due to its avoidance of edge habitat, the black-chinned sparrow is vulnerable to habitat fragmentation. Because of that vulnerability, it may be a useful species for indicating environmental changes. It may also be adversely affected by climate change; between 2000 and 2020, its breeding range shifted perceptibly northwards. The National Audubon Society predicts that by 2080, none of its current breeding range will still be in use. Its winter range is predicted to be more stable, with some 65 percent of the current area still in use by 2080, and the total area of wintering range in the United States potentially increasing.
