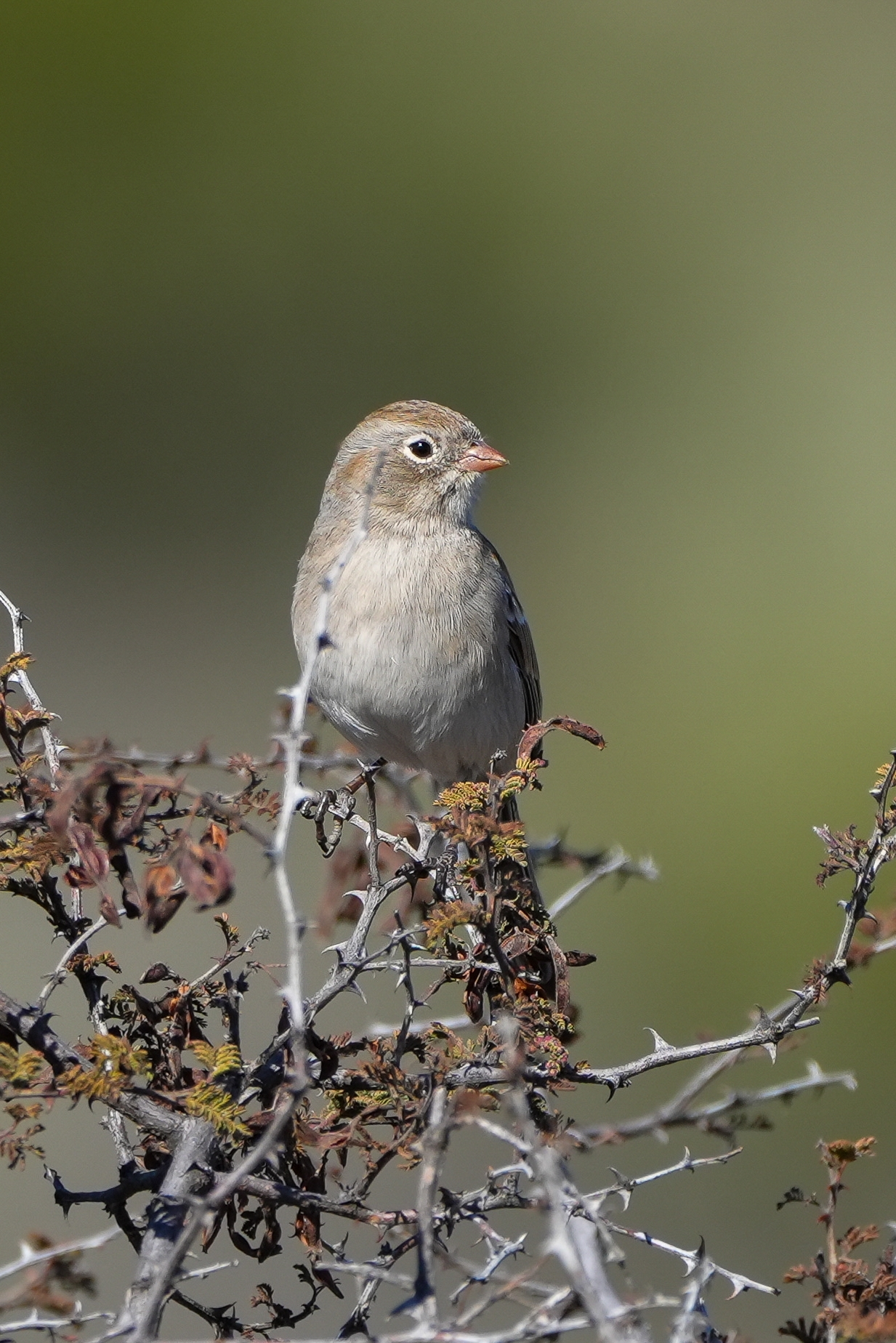

Conservation status
- Endangered (IUCN 3.1)

Scientific classification
- Kingdom: Animalia
- Phylum: Chordata
- Class: Aves
- Order: Passeriformes
- Family: Passerellidae
- Genus: Spizella
- Species: S. wortheni

Binomial name
- Spizella wortheni Ridgway, 1884

= Worthen's sparrow =

Species of bird

Worthen's sparrow (Spizella wortheni) is a species of American sparrow that is endemic to northeastern Mexico. It was first described by Robert Ridgway in 1884 and named for the American naturalist Charles K. Worthen. This small bird has been listed as endangered by the IUCN since 1994.

== Description ==
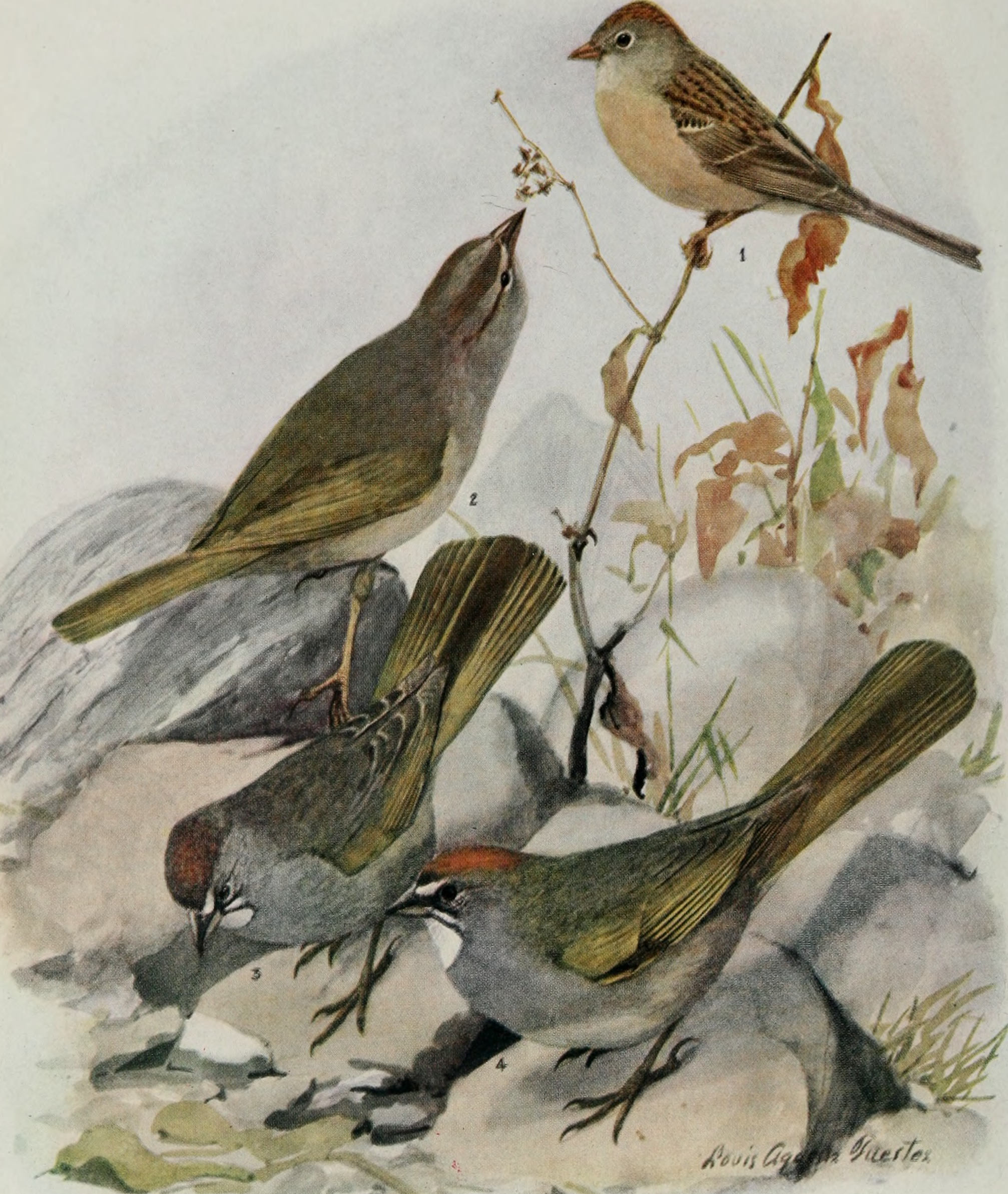
Top right is Worthen's sparrow

Spizella wortheni can range in length from 12.5 to 14 cm. It is identifiable by its distinctive head pattern. It has a grey head with a rufous crown, a brown postocular stripe and a pink bill. It has grey-brown upperparts, with dark brown streaks. It has a grey bottom, and dark brown wings and tail. Its wings are "edged paler, with broad whitish to pale buff wing-bar, buffy-rufous tertial and secondary edging, and greyish lesser coverts".

Juveniles are characterized by brownish colouration of the head and chest, with dusky streaking on the head and dark brown streaking on the chest and flanks.

The song is a dry, chipping trill of 2–3 seconds duration and is described as a cross between that of the field sparrow and that of the chipping sparrow.

Spizella wortheni song

The species is similar in appearance to the field sparrow (Spizella pusilla). However, they differ in plumage, habitat, and song.

The species nests from May to July and usually lays three or four eggs. Single-species flocks form after the breeding season and are strongly attracted to permanent sources of water.

The species is not migratory; however, a few sightings of individuals have taken place throughout the northwestern region of Mexico. Only one individual has ever been identified (shot) in the United States, and it was by Rieber on June 16, 1884, near Silver City, New Mexico. This individual, the first of the species to be described, is the type specimen.

== Habitat and range ==
Worthen's sparrow is endemic to northeastern Mexico and currently occupies a 25 km^{2} range. Populations formerly occurred in Zacatecas, Coahuila, Nuevo León, and Tamaulipas; however, presently it is only known to occur from southeastern Coahuila to western Nuevo León.

Spizella wortheni prefers open, arid shrub-grassland at elevations of 1,200–2,450 m (3,940–8,040 ft). For foraging, the species prefers open areas with low grasses. For nesting and cover, it usually inhabits low, dense shrubs.

In 2004, the population was estimated to be 100–120 individuals.

== Conservation ==
The major threat to this species is habitat destruction. The grassland Worthen's sparrow is specific to has progressively been ploughed for agriculture and grazing. Currently there is a conservation effort being coordinated by the Bird Conservation Alliance and other organizations to protect the Saltillo Savanna in Mexico. The program, known as the Mexican Grasslands Appeal, seeks to purchase over 1,000 acres (4.0 km^{2}) of prime grassland habitat to protect and save this last great North American grassland. By protecting this area, the appeal will conserve habitat for the Worthen's sparrow, long-billed curlew, burrowing owl, mountain plover, Sprague's pipit, and ferruginous hawk.
