= Anderson Lake State Fish and Wildlife Area =

State park in Illinois, United States

- Location within Illinois Location within the United States
- Location: Fulton / Schuyler counties, Illinois, U.S.
- Nearest city: Astoria, Illinois
- Coordinates: 40°12′05″N 90°11′30″W
- Area: 2,247 acres (909 ha)
- Established: 1947
- Governing body: Illinois Department of Natural Resources

Anderson Lake State Fish and Wildlife Area is an Illinois state park on 2,247 acres (909 ha) in Fulton County, Illinois, United States. A small part at the southern end extends into Schuyler County. Anderson Lake is located in the area.

== Natural features ==
This west floodplain lake receives overflow waters from the Illinois River. The Anderson lake has a surface area of 1,134 acres (459 ha) with an average depth of 4 ft (1.2 m) and a maximum depth of 6 ft (1.8 m) with 9.1 mi (14.6 km) shore is surrounded by bottomland forest.

A levee constructed in 1980 separates Anderson Lake from Carlson Lake, a smaller 231 acres (93 ha) lake to the south that serves as a waterfowl refuge area. Carlson Lake is drained in the spring to plant food for ducks, then flooded in the fall during migration season to attract waterfowl.

=== Flora ===
The site is primarily bottomland forest. Tree species include: silver maple, cottonwood, black willow, tulip poplar, black walnut, red maple, and American sycamore.

=== Fauna ===
Bird species include: mallard, wood duck, bald eagles, American white pelicans, American robin, cedar waxwing, chipping sparrow, osprey, red-tailed hawks, and purple martins.

== History ==
Anderson Lake SFWA was once a private duck-hunting club. The Anderson Lake and adjacent Carlson Lake area were purchased by the state in 1947, managed by the Illinois Department of Natural Resources (IDNR).

== Recreation ==
Anderson Lake has boat docks and two public boat ramps. Tent and trailer camping is available at Class C sites. Two picnic shelters and picnic tables are available. Hunting is permitted on 1,900 acres (770 ha) for waterfowl, doves, deer, rabbit, quail, and squirrel.
