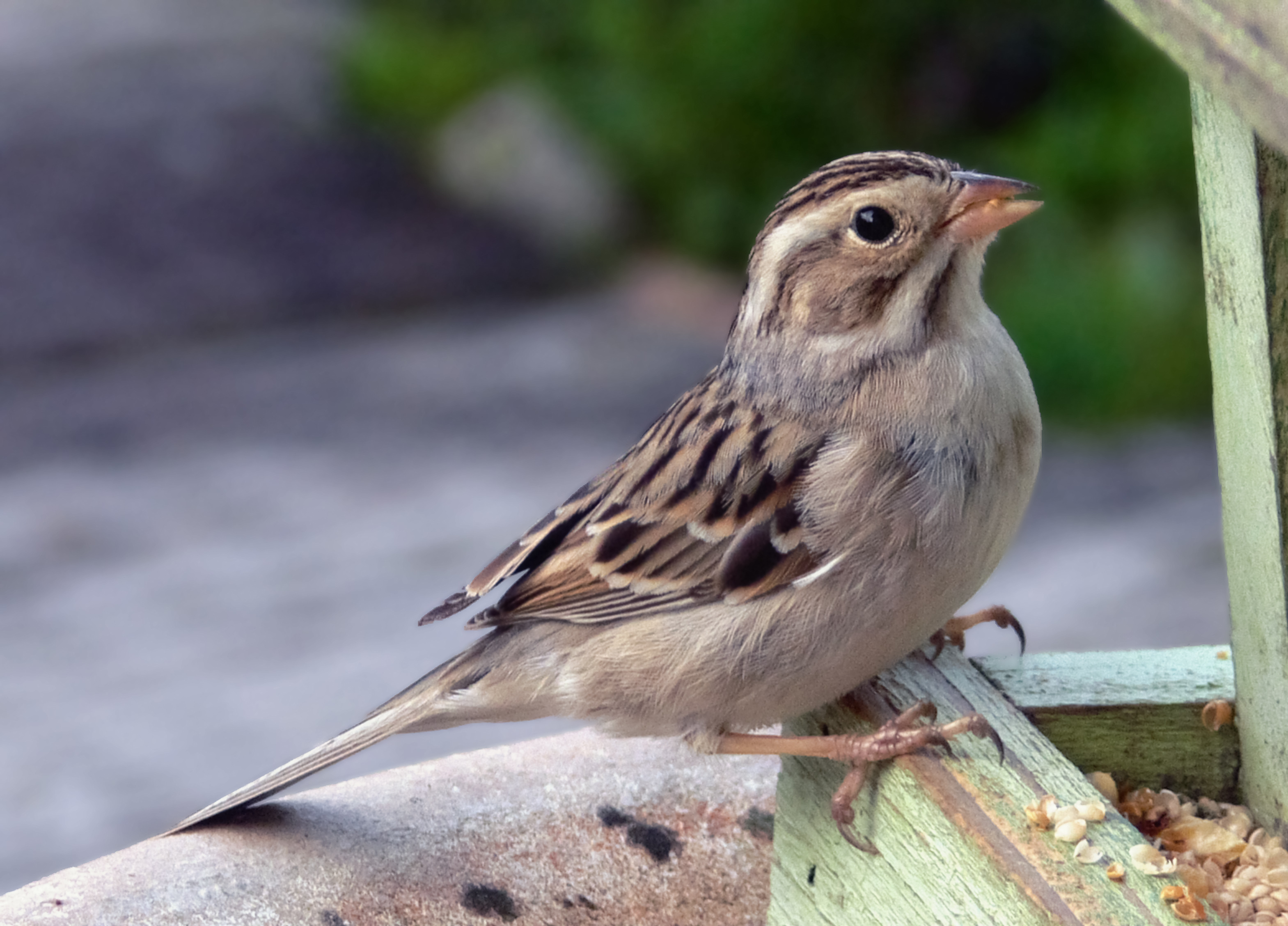

Conservation status
- Least Concern (IUCN 3.1)

- Secure (NatureServe)

Scientific classification
- Kingdom: Animalia
- Phylum: Chordata
- Class: Aves
- Order: Passeriformes
- Family: Passerellidae
- Genus: Spizella
- Species: S. pallida

Binomial name
- Spizella pallida (Swainson, 1832)
- Breeding Migration Nonbreeding

= Clay-colored sparrow =

Species of bird

The clay-colored sparrow or clay-coloured sparrow (Spizella pallida) is a small New World sparrow of North America.

Adults have light brown upperparts and pale underparts, with darker streaks on the back. They have a pale crown stripe on a dark brown crown, a white line over the eyes, a dark line through the eyes, a light brown cheek patch and brown wings with wing bars. The short bill is pale with a dark tip and the back of the neck is grey; they have a long tail. Non-breeding adults and immature resemble chipping sparrows and Brewer's sparrows; they often form flocks with these birds outside the nesting season.

Standard Measurements
length	5.1–6 in (130–150 mm)
weight	12 g (0.42 oz)
wingspan	7.5 in (190 mm)
wing	62.7–67.8 mm (2.47–2.67 in)
tail	62–68.4 mm (2.44–2.69 in)
culmen	8.7–9.8 mm (0.34–0.39 in)
tarsus	17.6–18.9 mm (0.69–0.74 in)

Their breeding habitat is shrubby open areas and jack pine woods across central Canada and central northern United States east to the Great Lakes, and is expanding further eastward. The nest is an open cup on the ground or low in a shrub.

These birds migrate in flocks to southern Texas and Mexico.

They forage on the ground, mainly eating seeds and insects. Outside the nesting season, they often feed in small flocks. While nesting, these birds may feed far from the nest; feeding areas are not defended.

The male sings from an open perch to indicate his ownership of the nesting territory. The song is a Bzzzz bzzzz za za.

This bird's nests are made of grasses and lined with fine materials or hair. Three to five splotched blue-green eggs are laid and incubated for 11 days. They are often parasitized by the brown-headed cowbird; the nest may be abandoned when this happens.

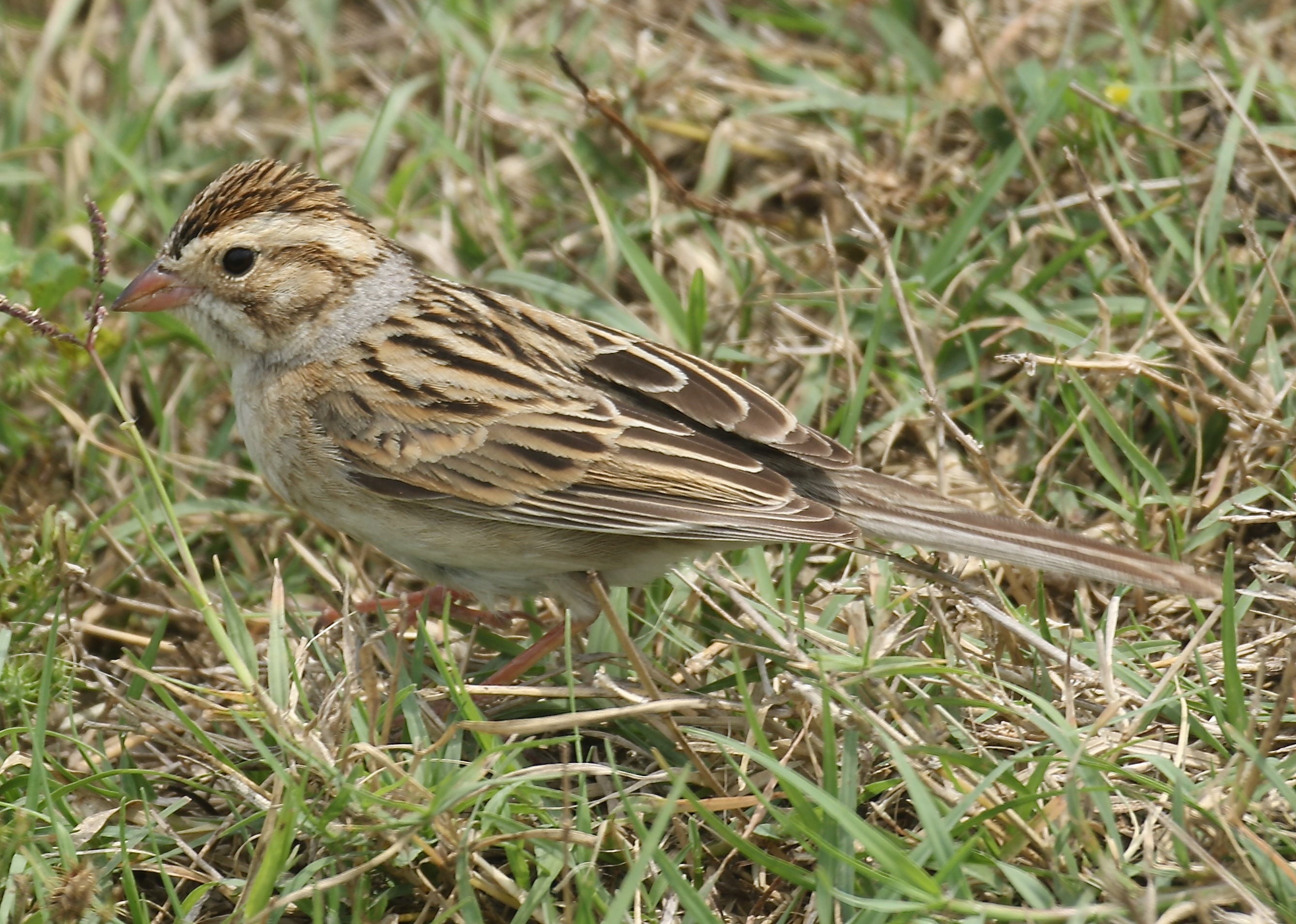
South Padre Island - Texas
