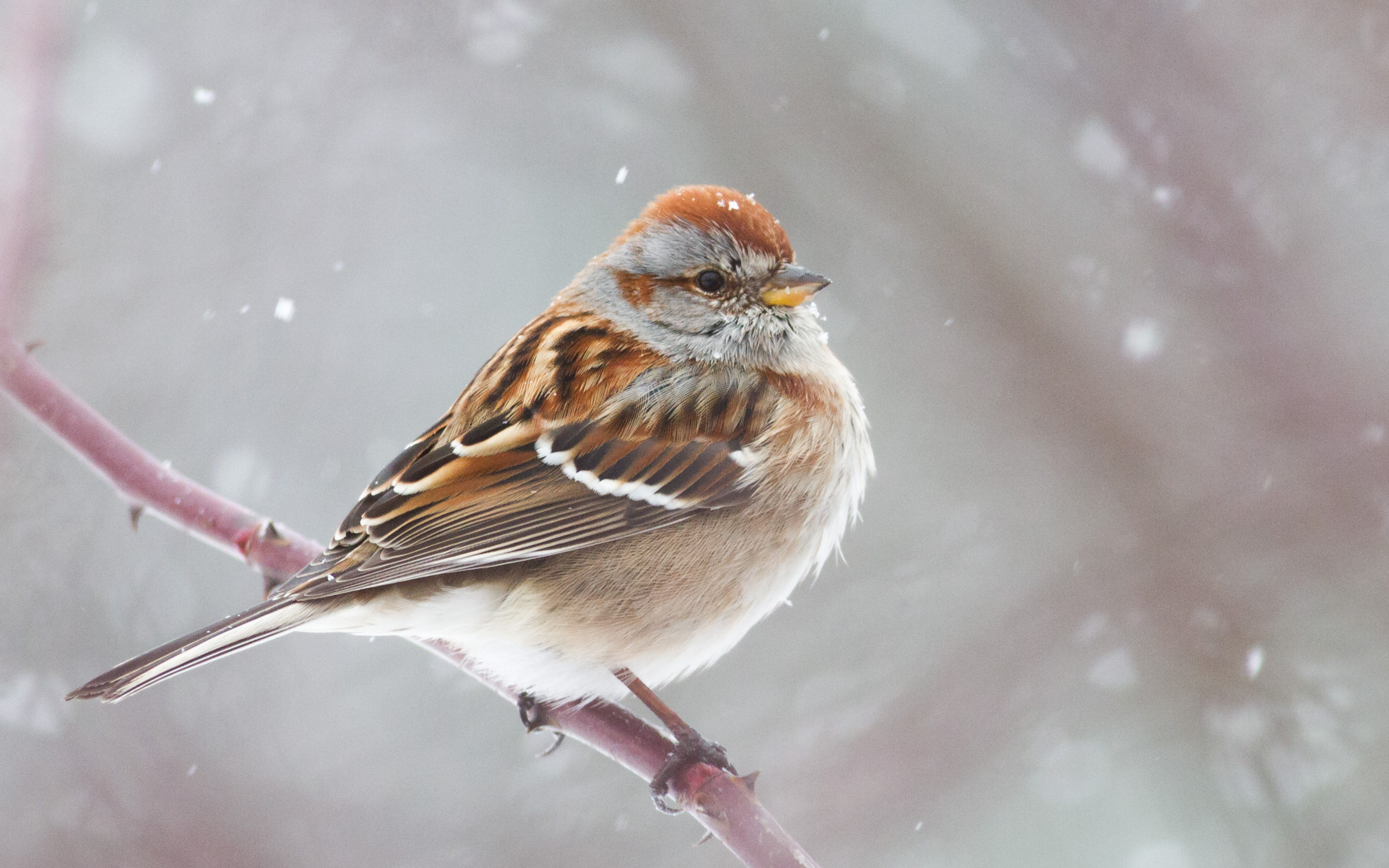

Conservation status
- Least Concern (IUCN 3.1)

Scientific classification
- Kingdom: Animalia
- Phylum: Chordata
- Class: Aves
- Order: Passeriformes
- Family: Passerellidae
- Genus: Spizelloides; Slager & Klicka, 2014
- Species: S. arborea

Binomial name
- Spizelloides arborea (Wilson, 1810)
- Range map of Spizelloides arborea Breeding Migration Nonbreeding

Synonyms
- Spizella monticola Spizella arborea Passerella arborea

= American tree sparrow =

Species of bird

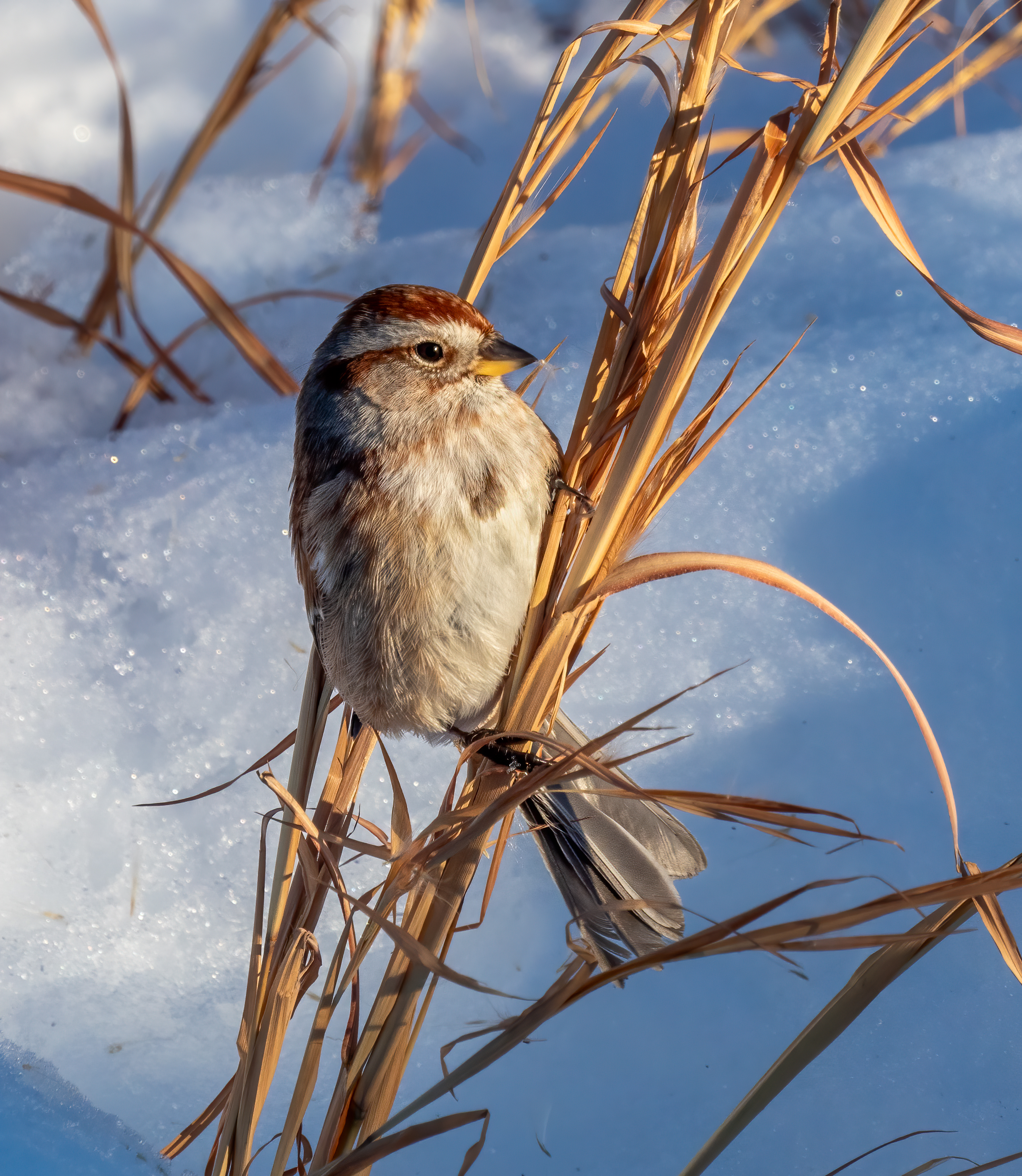
American tree sparrow in Central Park

The American tree sparrow (Spizelloides arborea), also known as the winter sparrow, is a medium-sized New World sparrow. It breeds in Alaska and Northern Canada and winters in Southern Canada and the Contiguous United States. It is the only member of the genus Spizelloides.

== Taxonomy ==
First described in 1810 by Alexander Wilson, it was included by John James Audubon in the first edition of The Birds of America under the name Canada bunting. The American tree sparrow was originally placed in the genus Spizella. In 2014, it was moved to its own monotypic genus, Spizelloides, based on polyphyly in Spizella and multilocus molecular evidence suggesting the species was strongly divergent from other extant genera.

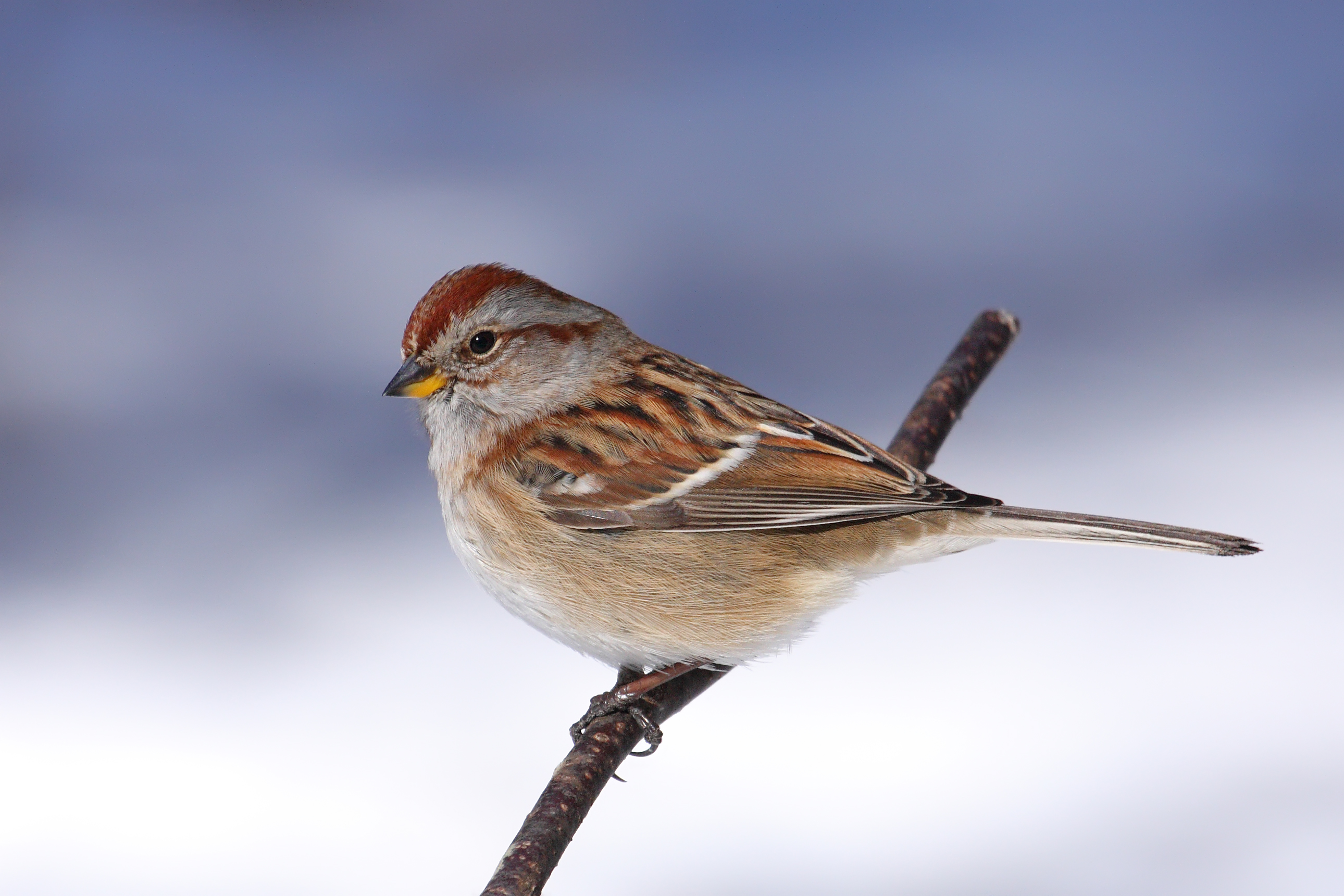

== Description ==
The bird's measurements are as follows:

- Length: 5.5 in (14 cm)
- Weight: 0.5–1.0 oz (13–28 g)
- Wingspan: 9.4 in (24 cm)

Adults have a rusty cap and grey underparts with a small dark spot on the breast. They have a rusty back with lighter stripes, brown wings with white bars and a slim tail. Their face is grey with a rusty line through the eye. Their flanks are splashed with light brown. They are similar in appearance to the chipping sparrow.

== Distribution and habitat ==
Their breeding habitat is tundra or the northern limits of the boreal forest in Alaska and northern Canada. They nest on the ground. American tree sparrows migrate into southern Canada and the United States to spend the winter.

== Diet and behavior ==
These birds forage on the ground or in low bushes, often in flocks when not nesting. They mainly eat seeds and insects, but also eat some berries. They are commonly seen near feeders with dark-eyed juncos.

=== Nesting and breeding ===
American Tree Sparrows typically nest on or near the ground. The nest is composed of fine grasses, feathers, mosses, twigs, and strips of bark.

Despite laying one egg per day over a week, the hatching of the chicks is synchronized to within a few hours of each other. Because of this, all the chicks fledge and forage together. Breeding pairs do not stay together after the season.

=== Call ===
This bird's song is a high warble descending in pitch and becoming buzzy near the finish.
