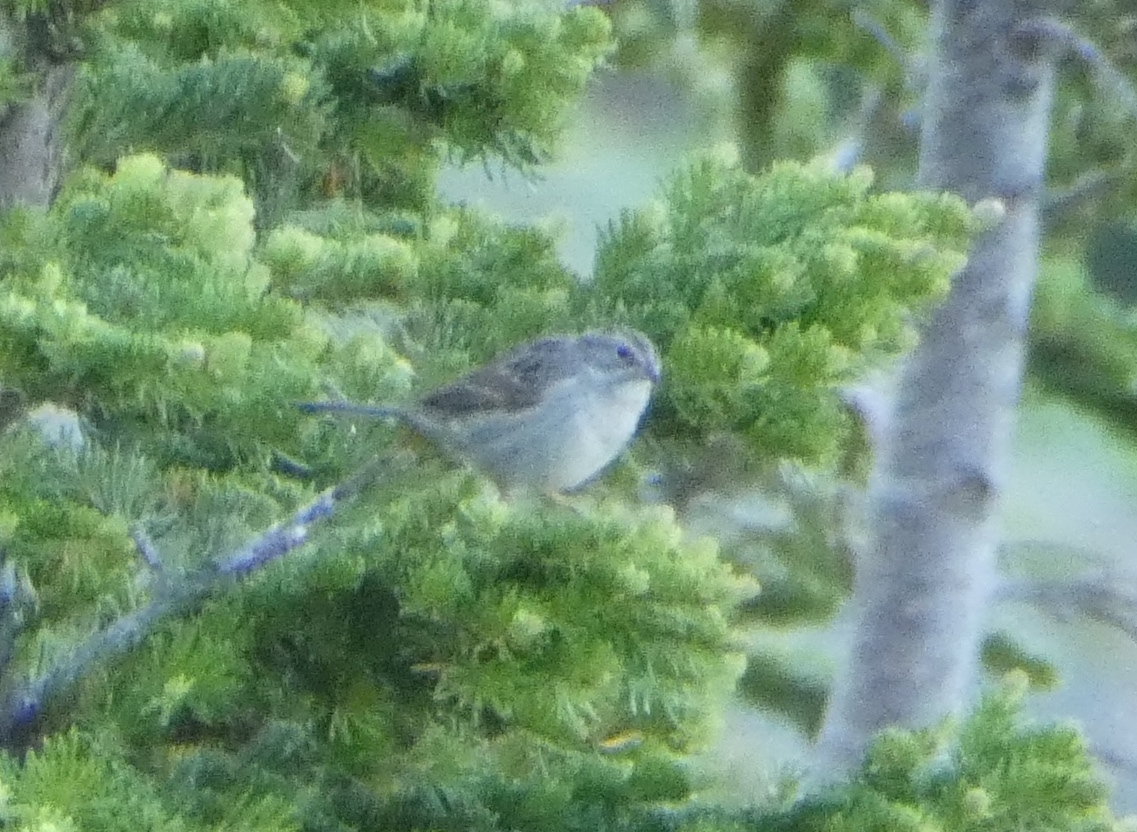

Conservation status
- Apparently Secure (NatureServe)

Scientific classification
- Kingdom: Animalia
- Phylum: Chordata
- Class: Aves
- Order: Passeriformes
- Family: Passerellidae
- Genus: Spizella
- Species: S. breweri
- Subspecies: S. b. taverneri

Trinomial name
- Spizella breweri taverneri Swarth & Brooks, 1925

Synonyms
- Spizella taverneri

= Timberline sparrow =

Subspecies of bird

The timberline sparrow (Spizella breweri taverneri) is a taxonomically controversial American sparrow. Usually treated as a subspecies of Brewer's sparrow, it is sometimes considered to be a separate species. While the timberline sparrow recognizably differs in some details, there is little reproductive isolation between the taxa.

When it was still considered a species, it was listed as being of least concern by the IUCN.

It breeds at high elevations in Northern Canada.

== Sources ==
- Baillie, J.E.M.; Hilton-Taylor, C. & Stuart, S.N. (eds.) (2004): 2004 IUCN Red List of Threatened Species. A Global Species Assessment. IUCN, Gland, Switzerland and Cambridge, UK. ISBN 2-8317-0826-5
- BirdLife International (2004). "Spizella taverneri". IUCN Red List of Threatened Species. 2004.
