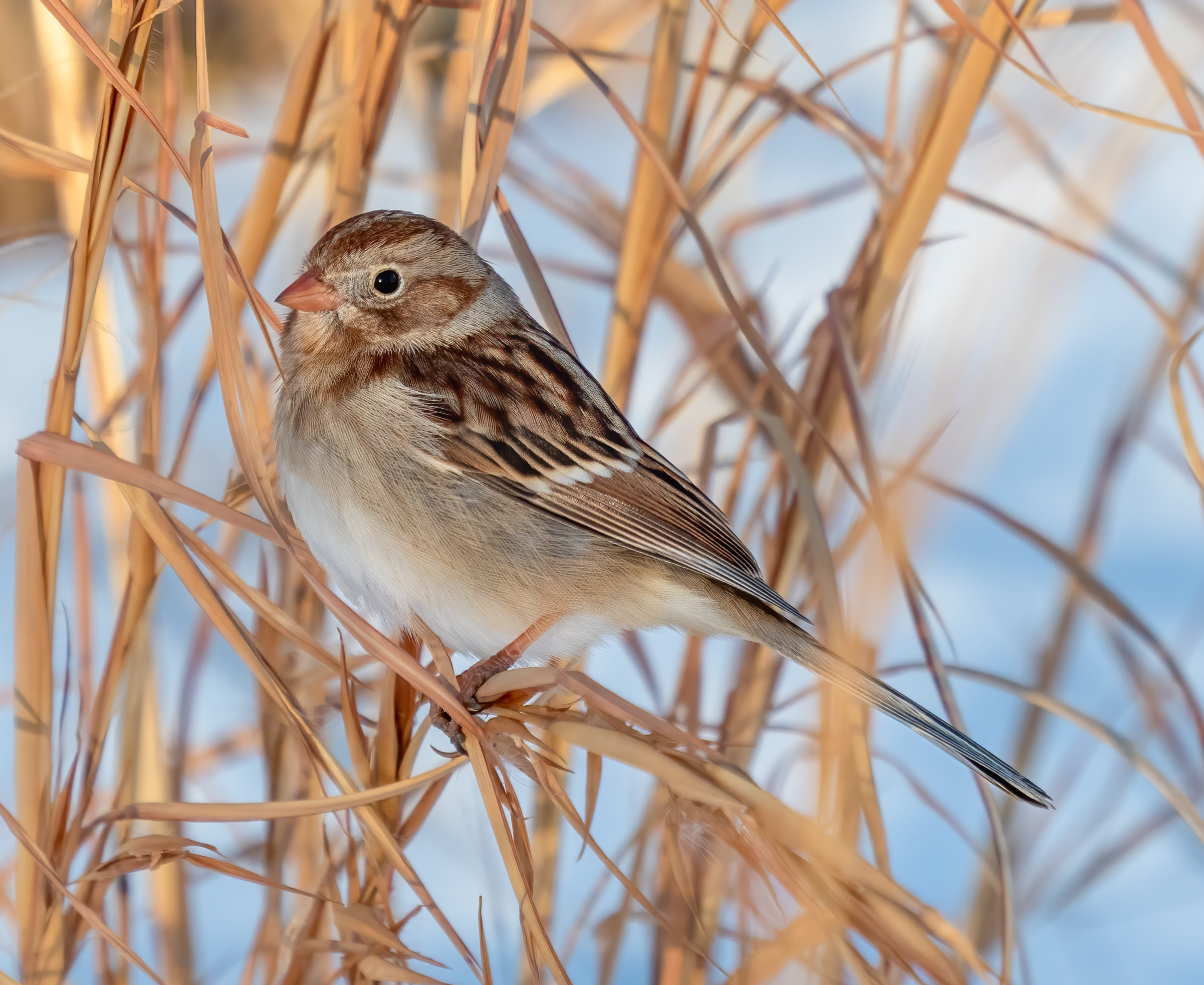
- Field sparrow Spizella pusilla

Scientific classification
- Kingdom: Animalia
- Phylum: Chordata
- Class: Aves
- Order: Passeriformes
- Family: Passerellidae
- Genus: Spizella; Bonaparte, 1832

Type species
- Fringilla pusilla A. Wilson, 1810

Species
- See text

= Spizella =

Genus of birds

The genus Spizella is a group of American sparrows in the family Passerellidae.

These birds are fairly small and slim, with short bills, round heads and long wings. They are usually found in semi-open areas, and outside of the nesting season they often forage in small mixed flocks.

== Systematics ==
This genus was formerly placed with the Old World buntings in the family Emberizidae. However, genetic studies revealed that New World sparrows formed a distinct clade and thus it was placed in the resurrected family Passerellidae.

=== Species ===
Genus Spizella – Bonaparte, 1832 – six species
Common name	Scientific name and subspecies	Range	Size and ecology	IUCN status and estimated population
Chipping sparrow	Spizella passerina (Bechstein, 1798)	Widespread across most of North America; partial migrant, with northerly populations overwintering in Mexico and the southern United States	Size: 12–15 cm (4.7–5.9 in); 11–17 g (0.4–0.6 oz); wingspan 21 cm (8.3 in) Habitat: Grassy, open woodland clearings and shrubby grass fields; coniferous forests in the west, woodland, farmland, parks and gardens in the east; nests in a tree (usually a conifer) or bush, below 6 m (20 ft) and about 1 m (3.3 ft) on average Diet: Seeds year-round, with insects forming most of the diet in the breeding season; spiders sometimes taken; forages on the ground in covered areas, often near field edges, and clambers on plants and trees for buds and small arthropods; gregarious in winter	LC
Clay-colored sparrow	Spizella pallida (Swainson, 1832)	Breeds across central Canada and the central northern United States east to the Great Lakes, expanding further eastward; migrates in flocks to southern Texas and Mexico	Size: 13–15 cm (5.1–6 in); 12 g (0.42 oz); wingspan 19 cm (7.5 in) Habitat: Shrubby open areas and jack pine woods; nest is an open cup on the ground or low in a shrub Diet: Forages on the ground, mainly seeds and insects; often feeds in small flocks outside the nesting season; may feed far from the nest while nesting	LC
Brewer's sparrow	Spizella breweri Cassin, 1856 Two subspecies: S. b. breweri (Cassin, 1856): brushy areas, especially with sagebrush, in southern parts of western Canada and the western United States; S. b. taverneri (Swarth & Brooks, 1925): Timberline sparrow; thicketed areas around the tree line in the Rockies of British Columbia, Alberta and northern Montana, the southern Yukon and southeastern Alaska	Southern parts of western Canada and the western United States, with the timberline subspecies around the tree line in the Rockies; migrates to the southwestern United States south to central Mexico	Size: 13–15 cm (5.1–5.9 in); 11–14 g (0.4–0.5 oz); wingspan 18–20 cm (7.1–7.9 in) Habitat: Brushy areas, especially with sagebrush; nests in a cup nest in low shrubs Diet: Forages primarily in shrubs or low vegetation, but also on the ground; mainly insects in summer, with seeds more important at other times; usually forages in flocks outside the breeding season, sometimes with other sparrows	LC Decreased in some parts of its range, suspected to be due partly to sagebrush habitat destruction
Field sparrow	Spizella pusilla (Wilson, 1810)	Eastern Canada and the eastern United States; permanent resident in the southern parts of its range, with northern birds migrating to the southern United States and northeastern Mexico	Size: 13–15 cm (5.1–6 in); 12.5 g (0.44 oz); wingspan 20 cm (8 in) Habitat: Bushy country with shrubs and grassland, including brushy, shrubby fields; nest is an open cup on the ground under a clump of grass or in a small thicket, with later nests built higher off the ground as the season progresses Diet: Forages on the ground or in low vegetation, mainly seeds and insects; may feed in small flocks outside the nesting season	LC Thought to be in slow decline; common species
Worthen's sparrow	Spizella wortheni Ridgway, 1884	Endemic to northeastern Mexico, now known only from southeastern Coahuila to western Nuevo León (formerly also Zacatecas and Tamaulipas), in a range of about 25 km² (9.7 sq mi)	Size: 12.5–14 cm (4.9–5.5 in) Habitat: Open, arid shrub-grassland at 1,200–2,450 m (3,900–8,000 ft); low, dense shrubs for nesting and cover Diet: Forages in open areas with low grasses; post-breeding single-species flocks are strongly attracted to permanent water	EN 100–120 individuals (2004 estimate)
Black-chinned sparrow	Spizella atrogularis (Cabanis, 1851) Four subspecies: S. a. evura (Coues, 1866): southwestern United States and northwestern Mexico (northern Sonora); Arizona black-chinned sparrow; S. a. caurina (Miller, 1929): west-central California; San Francisco black-chinned sparrow; S. a. cana (Coues, 1866): southwestern California and Baja California, Mexico; California black-chinned sparrow; S. a. atrogularis (Cabanis, 1851): north-central Mexico; Mexican black-chinned sparrow	Breeds in the southwestern United States (northern California east to western Texas, north to southern Nevada and Utah) and much of Mexico north of the Isthmus of Tehuantepec; most US populations migrate south, primarily into Mexico, while those in Mexico are resident	Size: 13–15 cm (5–5.75 in); 9.0–14.8 g (0.32–0.52 oz); wingspan 19–20 cm (7.5–7.75 in) Habitat: Arid and semi-arid shrubland: chaparral, sagebrush, pine-juniper woodland and other brushy areas, often remote, rugged and rocky; near sea level to 2,400 m (8,000 ft) in the United States and 300–2,500 m (980–8,200 ft) in Mexico; nests within about 1.2 m (4 ft) of the ground, typically at mid-level in a dense shrub Diet: Forages on or near the ground; mainly seeds in winter and insects in summer; occasionally captures insects in flight; alone, in pairs or in small groups, sometimes mixing with other Spizella sparrows	LC Decreasing; global estimates of 450,000–1,100,000 individuals

The American tree sparrow, Spizelloides arborea, was formerly a member of this group, but is now placed in its own monotypic genus Spizelloides.
