= Anderson Lake (Vancouver Island) =

Lake in British Columbia, Canada

- Location within Vancouver Island
- Location: Vancouver Island, British Columbia
- Coordinates: 49°44′00″N 125°12′00″W
- Lake type: Natural lake
- Basin countries: Canada

Anderson Lake is a lake located on Vancouver Island at the expansion of Dove Creek northwest of the city of Courtenay.

== See also ==
- List of lakes of British Columbia
