= Anderson Lake (Jefferson County, Washington) =

Lake in Washington state, USA

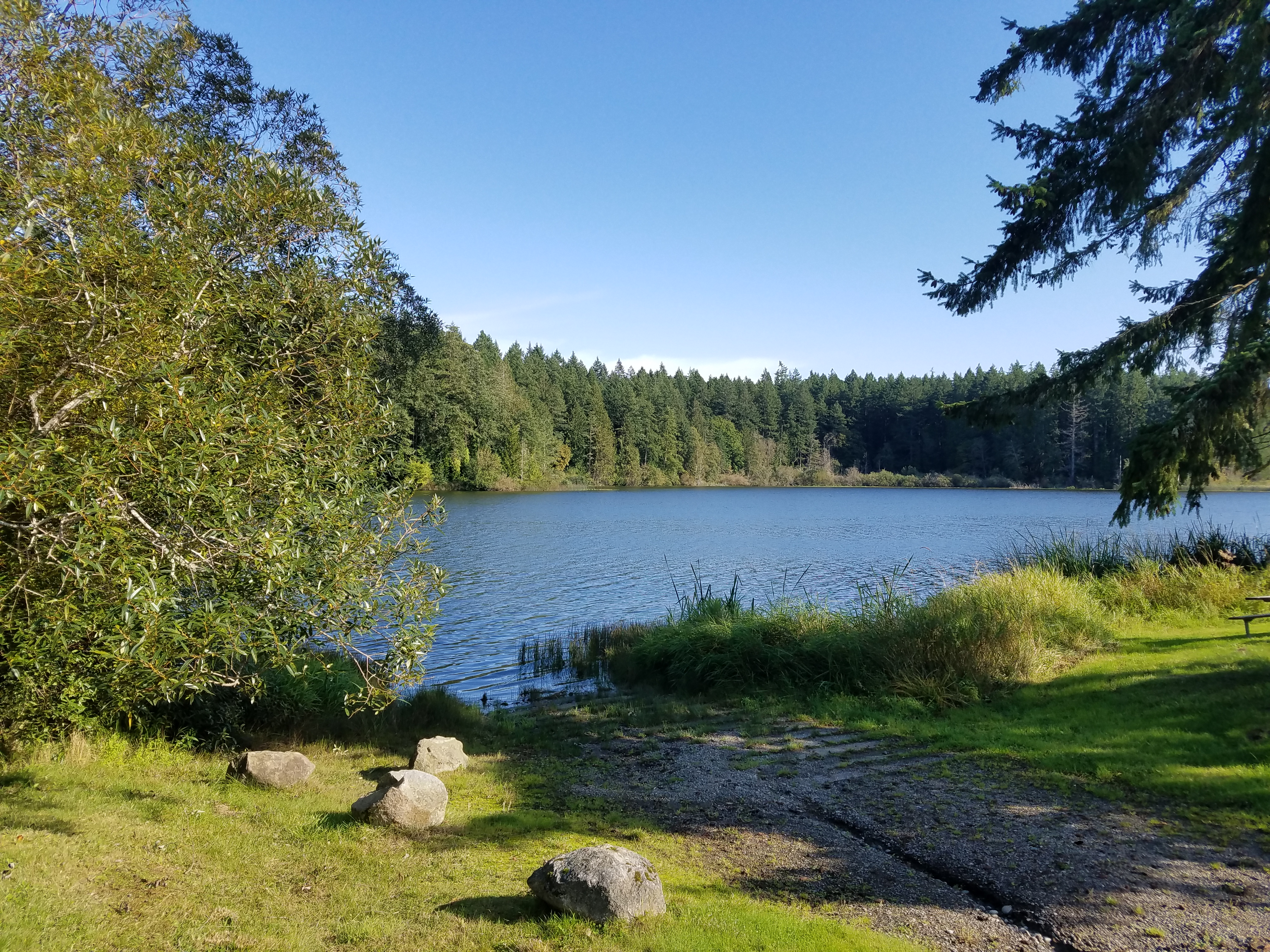

- Location in state of Washington
- Location: Jefferson County, Washington, United States
- Coordinates: 48°01′08″N 122°48′04″W
- Type: Lake
- Basin countries: United States
- Max. length: 3,057 ft (932 m)
- Max. width: 1,038 ft (316 m)
- Surface area: 57.3 acres (23.2 ha)
- Max. depth: 29 ft (9 m)
- Water volume: 1,228 acre⋅ft (1,500,000 m^{3})
- Surface elevation: 253 ft (77 m)
- Islands: 1

Anderson Lake is a 57-acre (23 ha) body of water located 1.5 miles (2.4 km) west of Chimacum in Jefferson County, Washingtonwithin Section 9, Township 29N, Range 1W. Anderson Lake has a maximum depth of 29 feet (8.8 m) and a water volume of 1,228 acre-feet (1,515,000 m^{3}). The lake drains into Chimacum Creek and Port Townsend Bay. It is surrounded by Anderson Lake State Park. The lake's fish population includes lake-reared rainbow trout that carry over to a second season from the initial spring fishery.

Toxic algae have caused the lake to be closed to all access on multiple occasions. The lake has annual cyanobacteria blooms dominated by dolichospermum (anabaena), aphanizomenon and microcystis. These blooms are a major producer of anatoxin-a, a potent neurotoxin. County health officials have seasonally monitored local lakes for blue-green algae since 2007.

== History ==
The lake was privately owned until it was purchased by the Washington State Parks and Recreation Commission in 1969. The lake bears the family name of an earlier owner, Amanda Anderson.
