= Anderson Lake State Park =

Park in the U.S. state of Washington

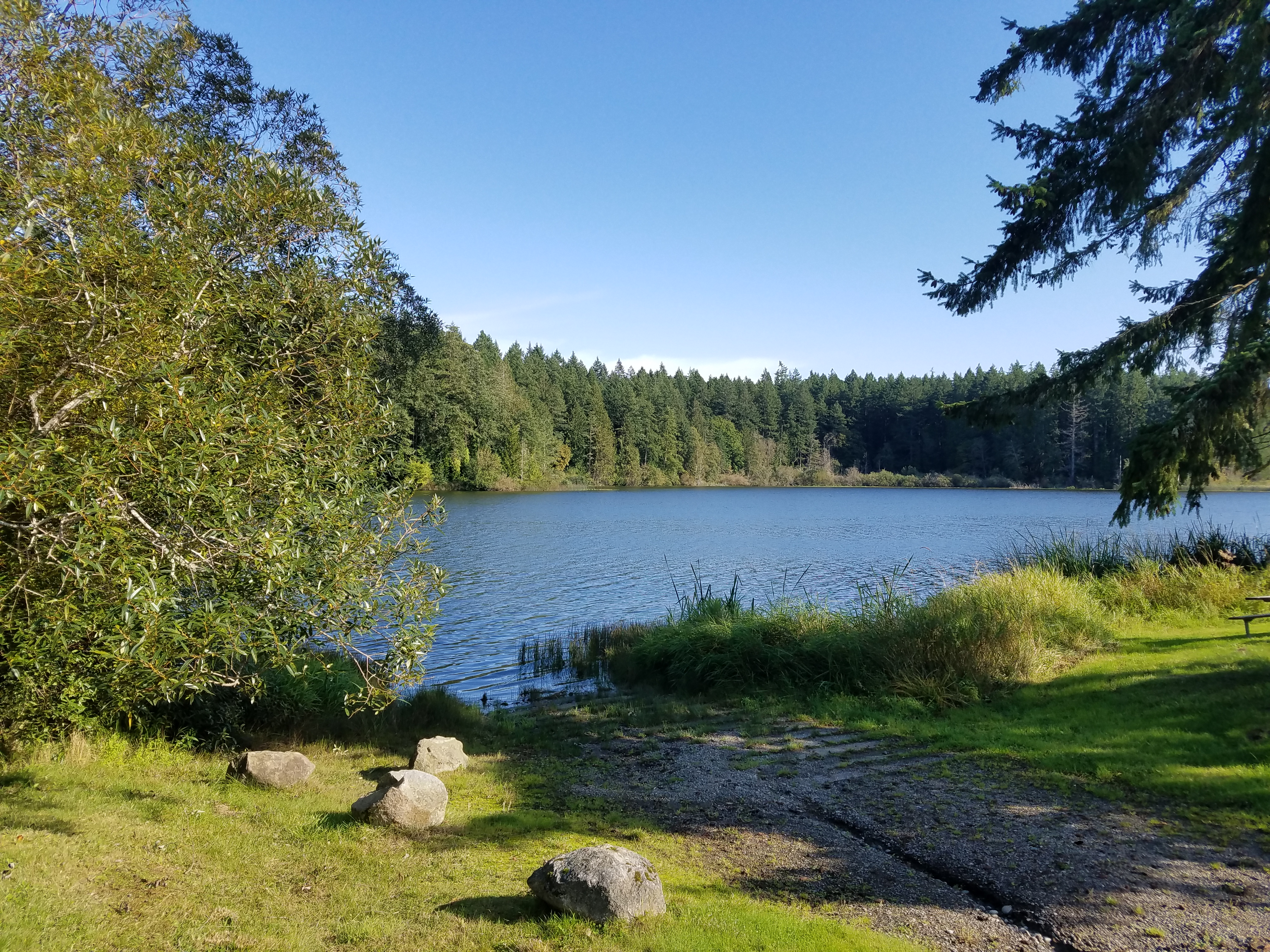

- Location within Washington (state)
- Interactive map of Anderson Lake State Park
- Location: Jefferson County, Washington, United States
- Coordinates: 48°01′07″N 122°48′04″W
- Area: 496 acres (201 ha)
- Elevation: 253 ft (77 m)
- Established: 1969
- Administrator: Washington State Parks and Recreation Commission
- Designation: Washington state park
- Named for: Amanda Anderson
- Website: Official website

Anderson Lake State Park is a public recreation area on the Quimper Peninsula, seven miles (11 km) south of Port Townsend, in Jefferson County, Washington. The state park has 496 acres (201 ha) of woods and wetland that slope down to 70-acre (28 ha) Anderson Lake. The park offers picnicking, trails for hiking, biking, and equestrian use, non-motorized boating, fishing, and birdwatching. The presence of toxic algae forbids water use of any kind from time to time. Algae blooms generally occur during late spring and summer months.
