= Anderson Lake (Poplar River) =

Lake in the state of Minnesota, United States

- Location within Minnesota
- Location: Cook County, Minnesota, U.S.
- Coordinates: 47°47′21″N 90°48′10″W
- Primary outflows: Poplar River
- Basin countries: United States
- Surface area: 28 acres (0 km^{2})

Anderson Lake is a 28-acre lake in Cook County, Minnesota which is a tributary to the Poplar River. It consists of a western lobe of 15 acres and an eastern lobe of 13 acres. Anderson Lake should not be confused with the Anderson Lake which is a tributary to the Temperance River and lies slightly more than one mile northwest.
