= Anderson Lake (Illinois) =

Lake in Illinois, United States

- Location within Illinois Location within the United States
- Location: Fulton County, Illinois
- Coordinates: 40°11′59″N 90°11′05″W
- Type: Freshwater
- Primary inflows: Illinois River
- Basin countries: United States
- Surface area: 1,364 acres (552 ha)
- Average depth: 3–5 ft (0.91–1.52 m)
- Max. depth: 7 ft (2.1 m)
- Shore length^{1}: 9.1 mi (14.6 km)
- Surface elevation: 436 ft (133 m)
- Islands: none
- Settlements: Havana
- ^{1} Shore length is not a well-defined measure.

Anderson Lake is a freshwater lake located in Fulton County, Illinois. It is 12.5 mi (20.1 km) southwest of Havana, Illinois.

== Natural features ==
This west floodplain lake receives overflow waters from the Illinois River. The lake has a surface area of 1,134 acres (459 ha) with an average depth of 4 ft (1.2 m) and a maximum depth of 6 ft (1.8 m). 9.1 mi (14.6 km) shore is surrounded by bottomland forest of silver maple, cottonwood, and willow trees.

A levee constructed in 1980 separates Anderson Lake from Carlson Lake, a smaller 231 acres (93 ha) lake to the south that serves as a waterfowl refuge area. Carlson Lake is drained in the spring to plant food for ducks, then flooded in the fall during migration season to attract waterfowl.

Fish species include: black bullhead, bluegill, channel catfish, crappie, and largemouth bass. Non-native species such as Asian carp, silver carp, and bighead carp are being monitored for their environmental impact. Sedimentation, loss of water volume, and lack of aquatic plants create challenges for fish species management in Anderson Lake.
