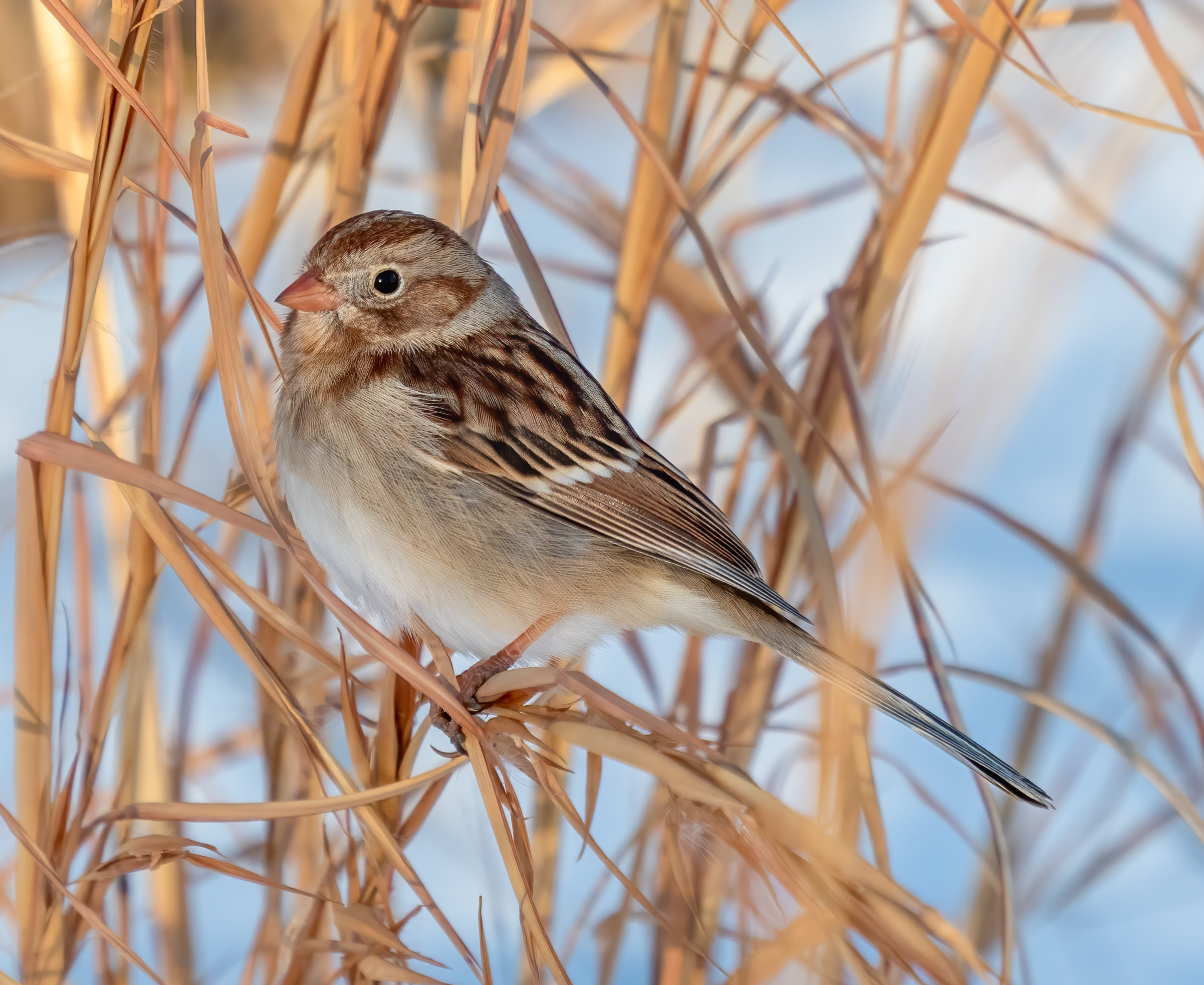

Conservation status
- Least Concern (IUCN 3.1)

Scientific classification
- Kingdom: Animalia
- Phylum: Chordata
- Class: Aves
- Order: Passeriformes
- Family: Passerellidae
- Genus: Spizella
- Species: S. pusilla

Binomial name
- Spizella pusilla (Wilson, 1810)
- Breeding Year-round Nonbreeding

= Field sparrow =

Species of bird

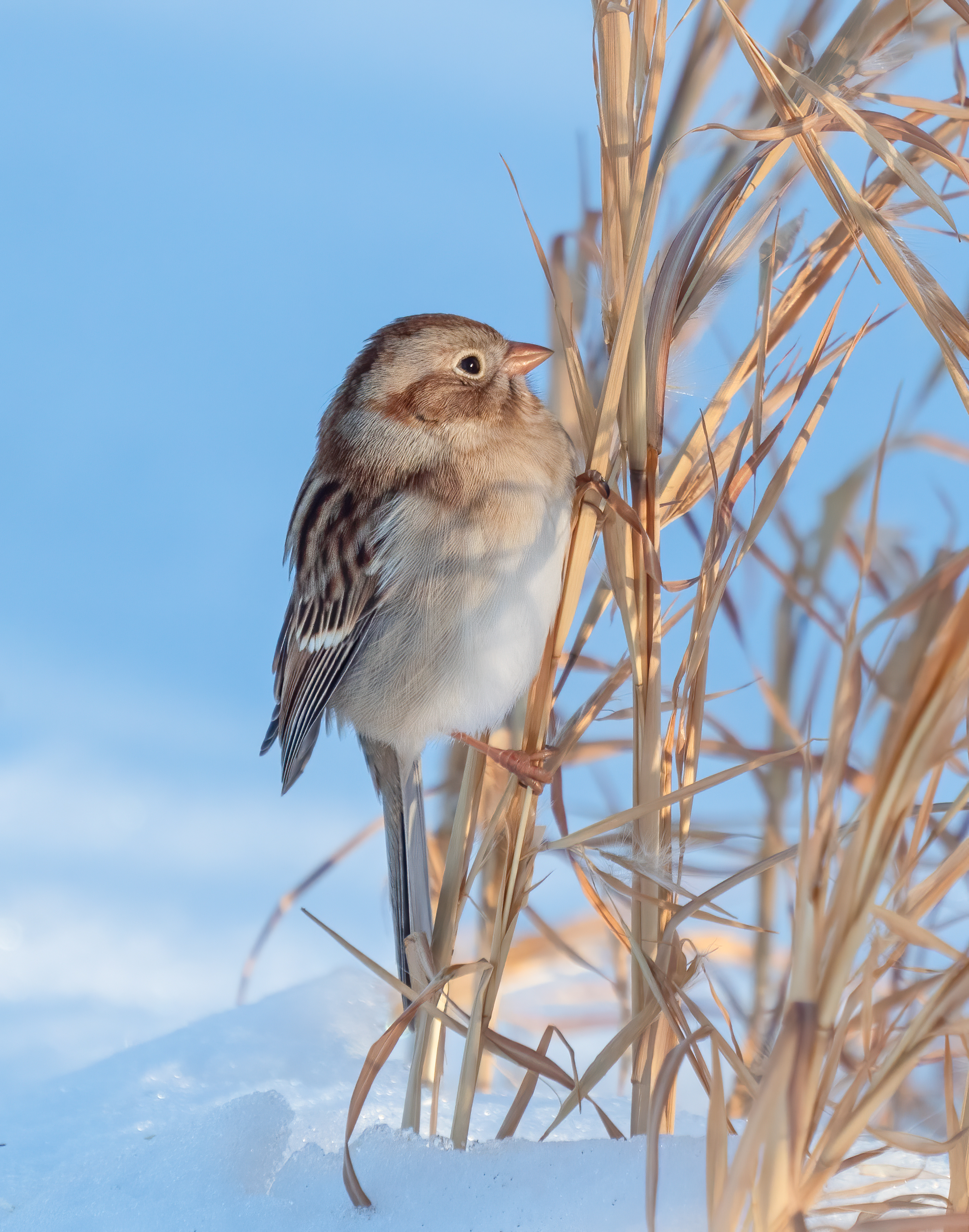
Field sparrow in Central Park

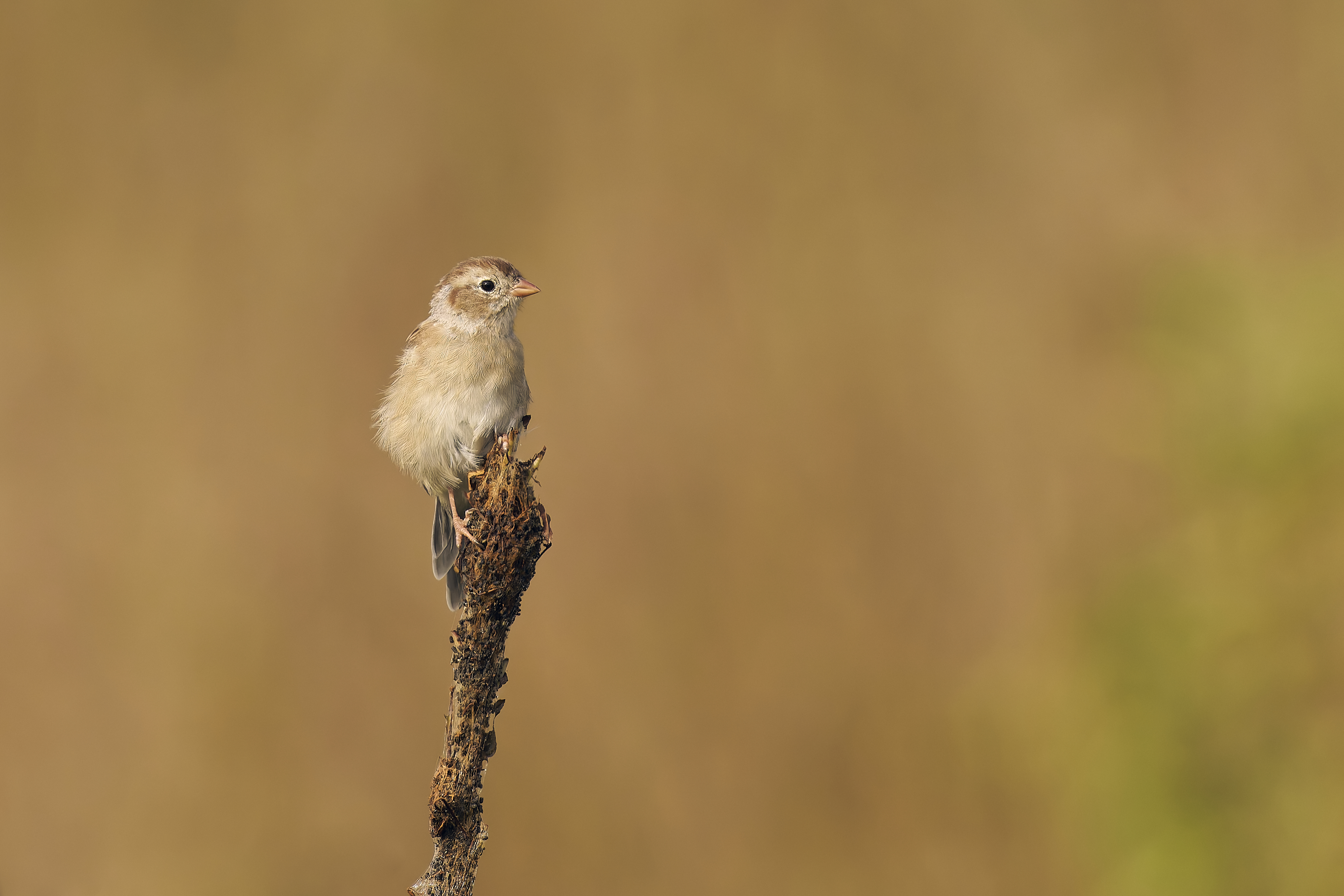
Perched. Suffield, CT

Song

The field sparrow (Spizella pusilla) is a small New World sparrow in the family Passerellidae. It is about 140 mm (6 in) long and weighs about 12.5 g (0.4 oz). The head is grey with a rust-coloured crown, white eye-ring and pink bill. The upper parts are brown streaked with black and buff, the breast is buff, the belly is white and the tail is forked. There are two different colour morphs, one being greyer and the other more rufous.

The field sparrow is distributed across eastern Canada and the eastern United States, with northern populations migrating southwards to southern United States and north-eastern Mexico in the fall. The typical habitat of this bird is bushy country with shrubs and grassland. The nest is a cup-shaped construction built on the ground and hidden beneath a bush or clump of grass. The birds forage on the ground or in low vegetation, feeding mainly on seeds and insects. The population is thought to be in slow decline, but it is a common species with a wide range, and the International Union for Conservation of Nature has assessed its conservation status as being of "least concern".

== Description ==
Adults have brown upperparts, a buffy breast, a white belly, two whitish wing bars and a dark-brown forked tail. They have a grey face, a rusty crown, a white eye ring and a pink bill. They have rusty markings behind the eye. There are grey and rufous colour variants of the species. Males and females have a similar appearance with males being slightly larger than the females.

Standard measurements
length	5.1–6 in (130–150 mm)
weight	12.5 g (0.44 oz)
wingspan	8 in (200 mm)
wing	62.7–67.8 mm (2.47–2.67 in)
tail	62–68.4 mm (2.44–2.69 in)
culmen	8.7–9.8 mm (0.34–0.39 in)
tarsus	17.6–18.9 mm (0.69–0.74 in)

== Distribution and habitat ==
Their breeding habitat is brushy, shrubby fields across eastern North America. The nest is an open cup on the ground under a clump of grass or in a small thicket. They often breed more than once in each season, and each time they build a new nest, the nest is built higher off the ground as the season progresses and leaves grow in..Their eggs are laid in May or June; they are pale bluish white, speckled and blotched with yellowish brown and grayish purple.

These birds are permanent residents in the southern parts of their range. Northern birds migrate to the southern United States and Mexico.

== Habits ==
These birds forage on the ground or in low vegetation, mainly eating insects and seeds. They may feed in small flocks outside the nesting season.

The male sings from a higher perch, such as a shrub or fencepost, which indicates his ownership of the nesting territory. The song is a series of sad whistles ending in a trill, the sound formed like the accelerating sound of a bouncing ball has the quality coming to rest, usually last a long 4 seconds, both are often compared.

This bird's numbers expanded as settlers cleared forests in eastern North America, but may have declined in more recent times. Despite this, it is a common species with a wide range, and the International Union for Conservation of Nature has assessed its conservation status as being of "least concern".
