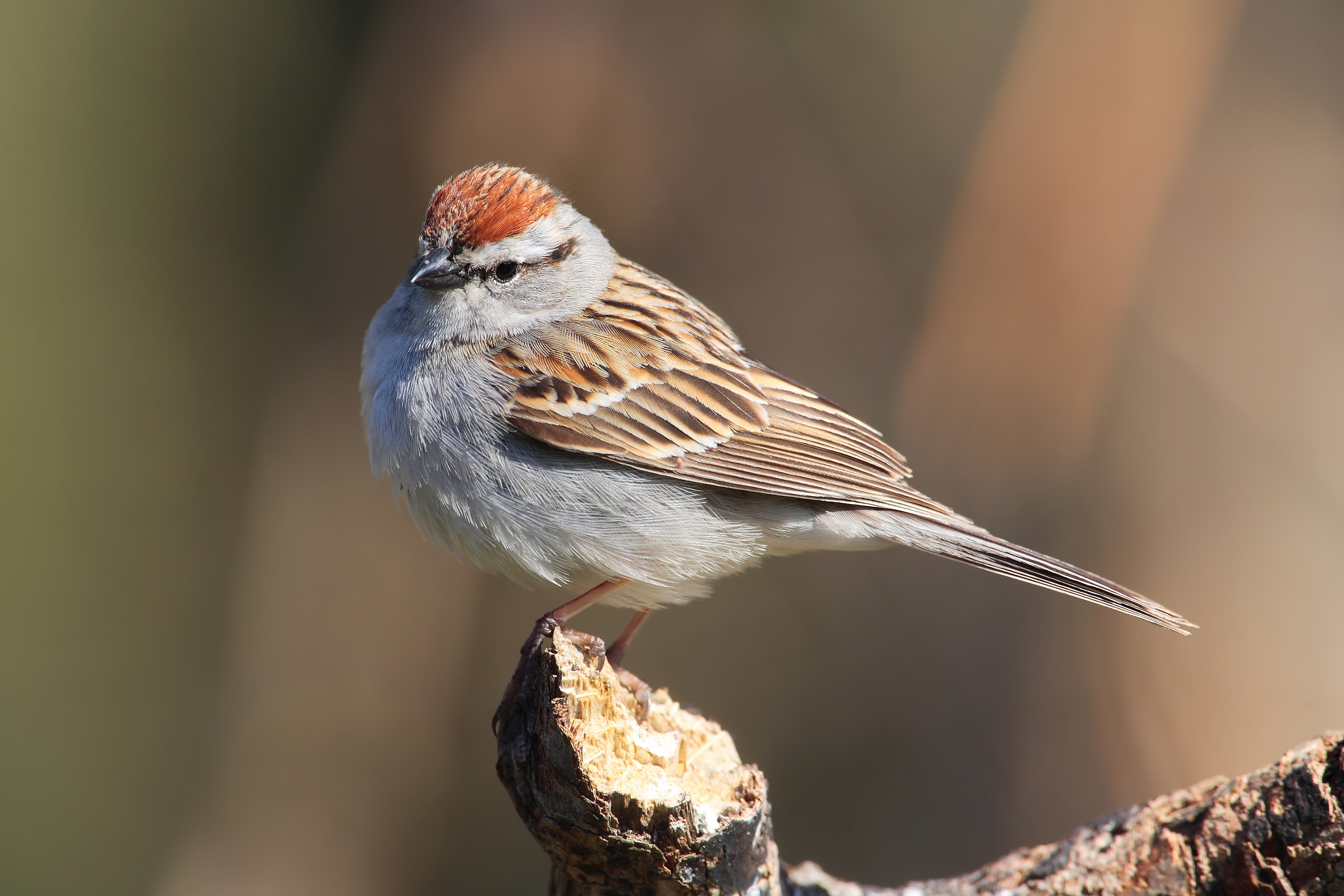
- Adult S. p. passerina in breeding plumage, Ontario

Conservation status
- Least Concern (IUCN 3.1)

Scientific classification
- Kingdom: Animalia
- Phylum: Chordata
- Class: Aves
- Order: Passeriformes
- Family: Passerellidae
- Genus: Spizella
- Species: S. passerina

Binomial name
- Spizella passerina (Bechstein, 1798)
- Range map of Spizella passerina Breeding Migration Year-round Nonbreeding

Synonyms
- Spizella socialis (Wilson, 1810); Fringilla socialis Wilson, 1810; Fringilla passerina Bechstein, 1798

Audio

= Chipping sparrow =

Species of bird

The chipping sparrow (Spizella passerina) is a species of New World sparrow, a passerine bird in the family Passerellidae. It is widespread, fairly tame, and common across most of its North American range.

The chipping sparrow has five subspecies. This bird is a partial migrant with northerly populations flying southwards in the fall to overwinter in Mexico and the southern United States, and flying northward again in spring.

== Description ==
Throughout the year, adults are gray below and an orangish-rust color above. Adults in alternate (breeding) plumage have a reddish cap, a nearly white supercilium, and a black trans-ocular line (running through the eye). Adults in basic (nonbreeding) plumage are less prominently marked, with a brownish cap, a dusky eyebrow, and a dark eye-line.

Juvenile chipping sparrows are prominently streaked below. Like non-breeding adults, they show a dark eye-line, extending both in front of and behind the eye. The brownish cap and dusky eyebrow are variable but generally obscure in juveniles.

Measurements:

- Length: 4.7–5.9 in (12–15 cm)
- Weight: 0.4–0.6 oz (11–17 g)
- Wingspan: 8.3 inches (21 cm)

Four songs of the chipping sparrow
American robin, song sparrow, red-winged blackbird and common grackle sing in background.

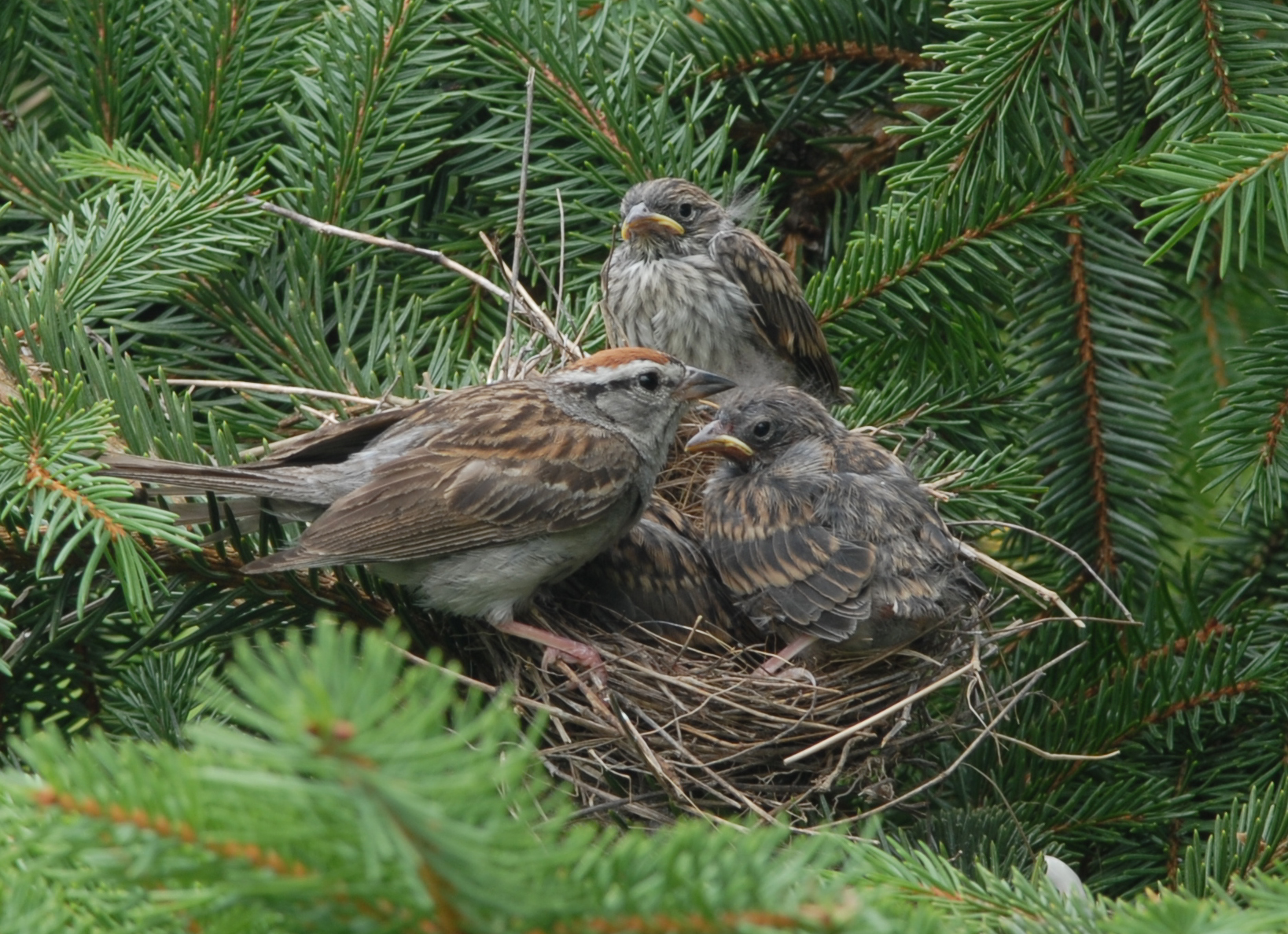
Adult S. p. passerina and nestlings in a tree nest

S. p. arizonae with nesting material

== Behavior ==
It molts twice a year. In its breeding plumage it has orangish-rust upper parts, gray head and underparts and a distinctive reddish cap. In non-breeding plumage, the cap is brown and the facial markings are less distinct. The song is a trill and the bird has a piercing flight call that can be heard while it is migrating at night.

In the winter, Chipping Sparrows are gregarious and form flocks, sometimes associating with other bird species. They mostly forage on the ground for seeds and other food items, as well as clambering on plants and trees, feeding on buds and small arthropods. In the west of their range they breed mainly in coniferous forests, but in the east, they choose woodland, farmland, parks and gardens. Breeding starts in late April and May and the nest is often built in a tree.

This bird filled much the same niche as house sparrows now do before their introduction to North America, inhabiting cities in large numbers, and they continue to be associated with human habitations and relatively unafraid of people in areas where house sparrows are not present.

== Breeding ==
The male chipping sparrows start arriving at the breeding grounds from March (in more southern areas, such as Texas) to mid-May (in southern Alberta and northern Ontario). The female arrives one to two weeks later, and the male starts singing soon after to find and court a mate. After pair formation, nesting begins (within about two weeks of the female's arrival).

The chipping sparrow breeds in grassy, open woodland clearings and shrubby grass fields. The nest is normally above ground but below 6 metres (20 ft) in height, and about 1 metre (3.3 ft) on average, in a tree (usually a conifer, especially those that are young, short, and thick) or bush. The nest itself is constructed by the female in about four days. It consists of a loose platform of grass and rootlets and open inner cup of plant fiber and animal hair.

The chipping sparrow lays a clutch of two to seven pale blue to white eggs with black, brown, or purple markings. They are about 17 by 12 millimetres (0.67 by 0.47 in), and incubated by the female for 10 to 15 days. The chipping sparrow is often brood parasitized by brown-headed cowbirds, usually resulting in the nest being abandoned.

== Feeding ==
The chipping sparrow feeds on seeds year-round, although insects form most of the diet in the breeding season. Spiders are sometimes taken. Taraxacum officinale seeds are important during spring, and seeds from Fallopia convolvulus, Melilotus spp., Stellaria media, Chenopodium album, Avena spp., and others.

Throughout the year, chipping sparrows forage on the ground in covered areas, often near the edges of fields.

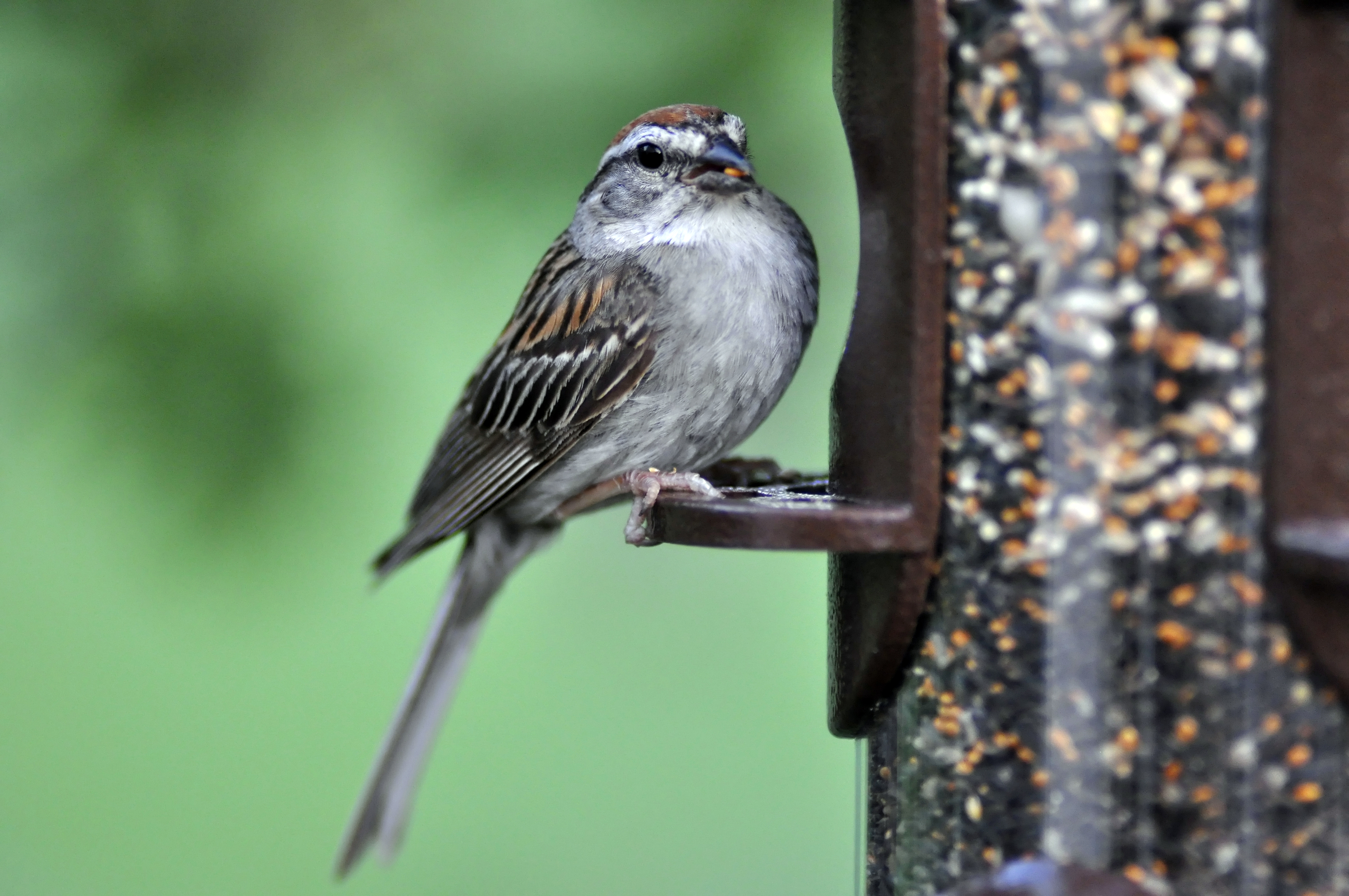
S. p. passerina at a bird feeder
