= List of birds of Arizona =

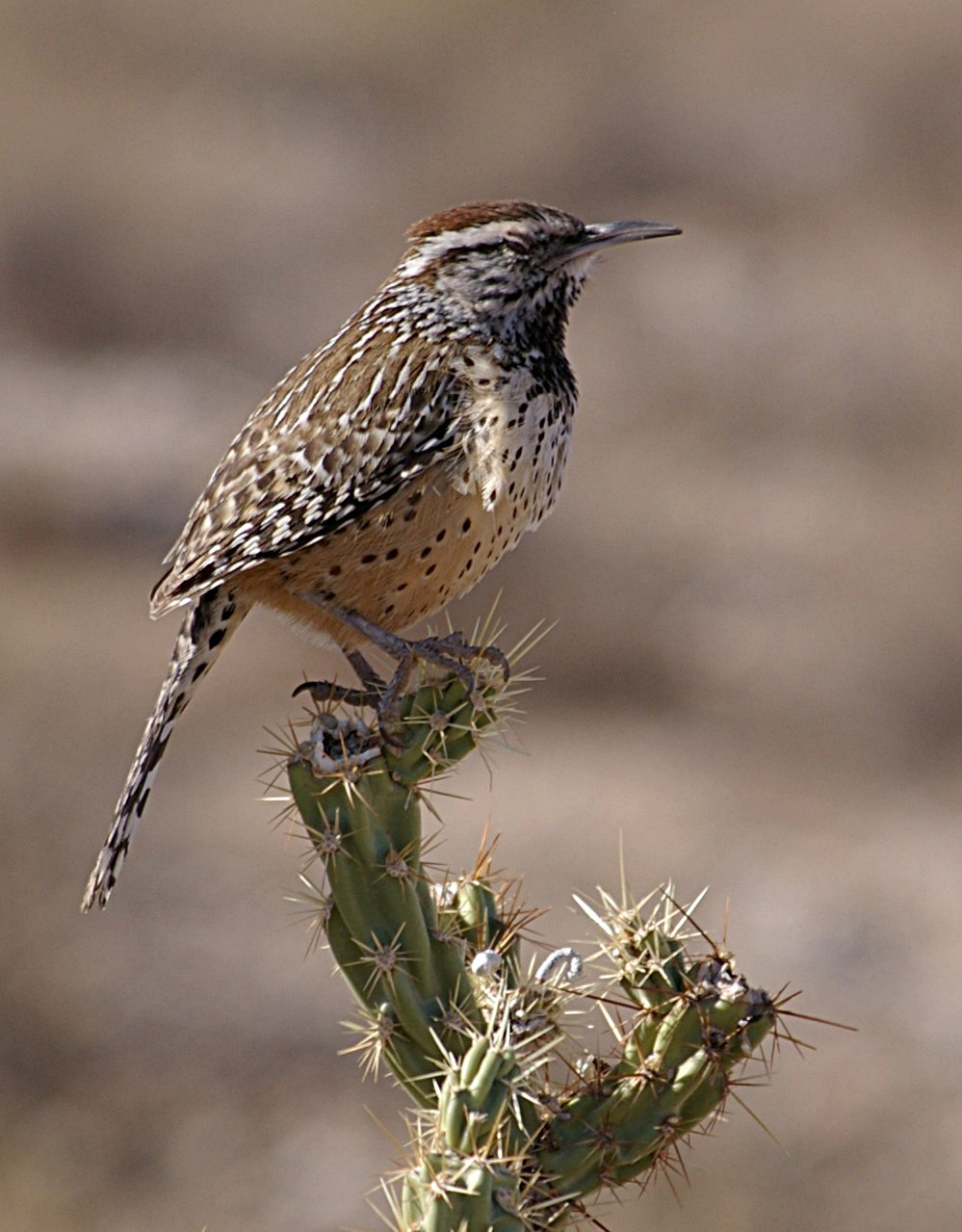
The cactus wren is the state bird of Arizona.

This list of birds of Arizona includes every wild bird species seen in Arizona, as recorded by the Arizona Bird Committee (ABC) through January 2023.

This list is presented in the taxonomic sequence of the Check-list of North and Middle American Birds, 7th edition through the 63rd Supplement, published by the American Ornithological Society (AOS). Common and scientific names are also those of the Check-list, except that the common names of families are from the Clements taxonomy because the AOS list does not include them.

The following tags have been used to identify categories of occurrence:

- (n) – Nesting: Per the ABC, this denotes "[a] species that has hatched young at least once, however, this does not include hybrid offspring"
- (Int) – Introduced: Birds that have been introduced to North America by the actions of humans, either directly or indirectly
- (Ex) – Extirpated: Birds that have formerly bred in Arizona but no longer do; reintroduction attempts may have been made but the species remains unestablished
- (A) – Accidental: Birds that have been seen only a few times, or only once; the ABC requires a formal report for sightings of them to be included in the official record
- (H) – Hypothetical: Birds that have had a credible sighting reported, but have not been documented with physical evidence such as a specimen or photograph

The ABC list contains 569 species, including one "slash" entry for a record which could not be identified at the species level. Of them, 153 taxa are considered accidental, eight as introduced by humans, four as extirpated, and two as hypothetical. As of July, 2024, two additional species have been added from outstanding sources since the most recent update. Hypothetical species have also been added from another source. Nesting has been recorded for 309 taxa. The list also includes eight forms or groups of subspecies which have been recorded in the state, all requiring committee review. This list has been prepared with the Arizona Bird Committee (Jan. 2024).

== Ducks, geese, and waterfowl ==
Order: Anseriformes Family: Anatidae

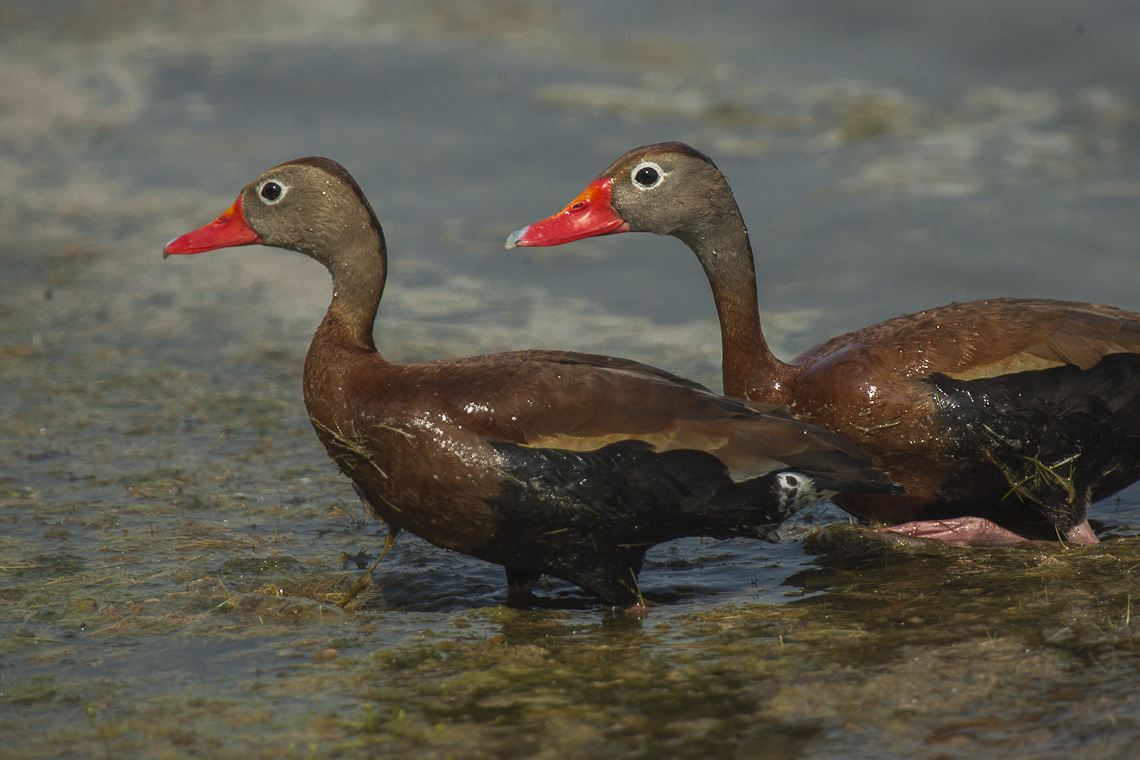
Black-bellied whistling-duck

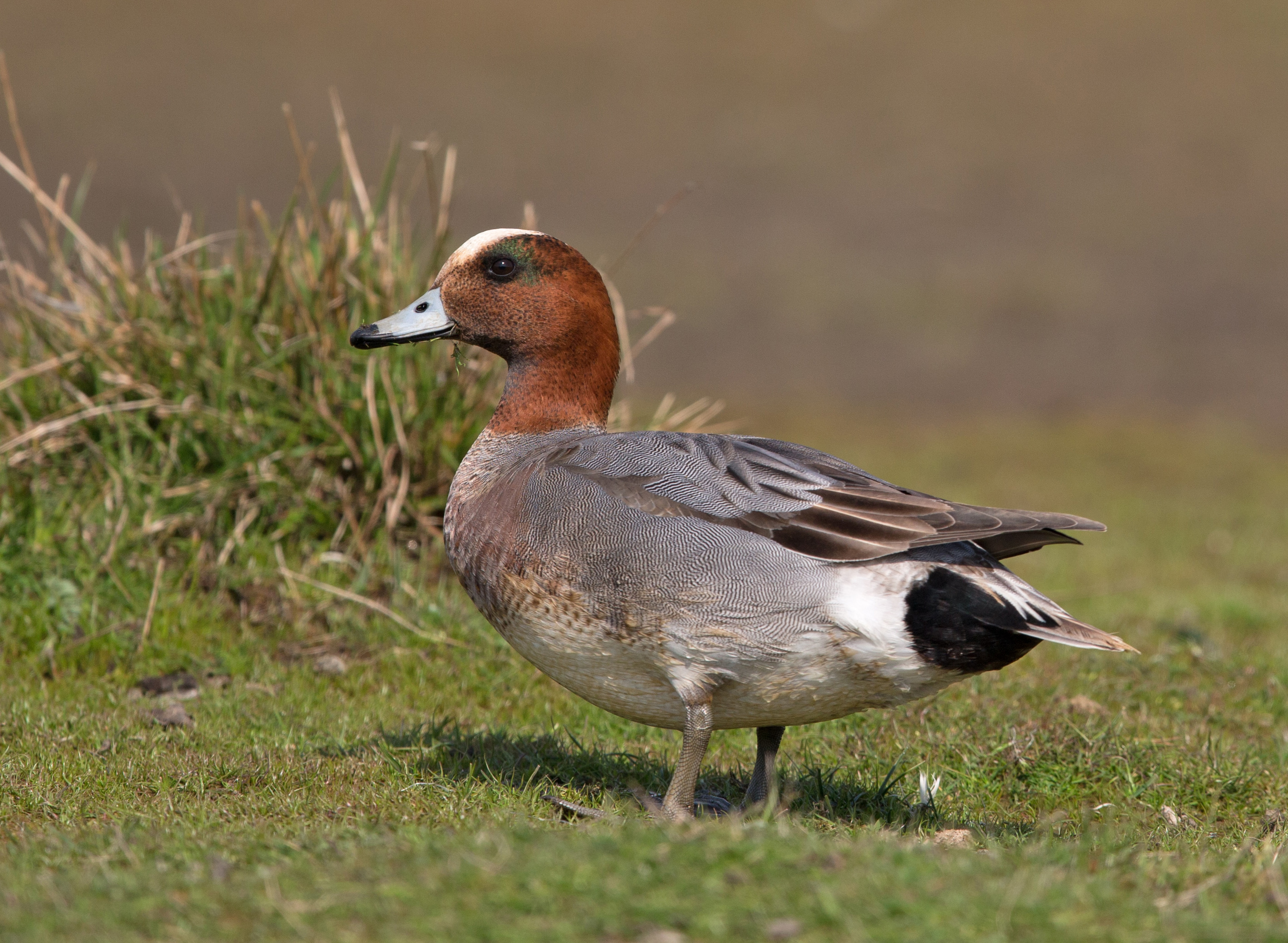
Eurasian wigeon

The family Anatidae includes the ducks and most duck-like waterfowl, such as geese and swans. These birds are adapted to an aquatic existence with webbed feet, bills which are flattened to a greater or lesser extent, and feathers that are excellent at shedding water due to special oils.

- Black-bellied whistling-duck, Dendrocygna autumnalis (n)
- Fulvous whistling-duck, Dendrocygna bicolor (A)
- Snow goose, Anser caerulescens
- Ross's goose, Anser rossii
- Greater white-fronted goose, Anser albifrons
- Brant, Branta bernicla (A)
- Cackling goose, Branta hutchinsii
- Canada goose, Branta canadensis (n)
- Trumpeter swan, Cygnus buccinator (A)
- Tundra swan, Cygnus columbianus
- Wood duck, Aix sponsa (n)
- Baikal teal, Sibirionetta formosa (A)
- Garganey, Spatula querquedula (A)
- Blue-winged teal, Spatula discors (n)
- Cinnamon teal, Spatula cyanoptera (n)
- Northern shoveler, Spatula clypeata (n)
- Gadwall, Mareca strepera (n)
- Eurasian wigeon, Mareca penelope
- American wigeon, Mareca americana (n)
- Mallard, Anas platyrhynchos (n)
- Mexican duck, Anas diazi (n)
- Northern pintail, Anas acuta (n)
- Green-winged teal, Anas crecca (n)
  - Eurasian (crecca) form (A)
- Canvasback, Aythya valisineria (n)
- Redhead, Aythya americana (n)
- Ring-necked duck, Aythya collaris (n)
- Tufted duck, Aythya fuligula (A)
- Greater scaup, Aythya marila
- Lesser scaup, Aythya affinis
- Harlequin duck, Histrionicus histrionicus (A)
- Surf scoter, Melanitta perspicillata
- White-winged scoter, Melanitta deglandi
- Black scoter, Melanitta americana
- Long-tailed duck, Clangula hyemalis
- Bufflehead, Bucephala albeola
- Common goldeneye, Bucephala clangula
- Barrow's goldeneye, Bucephala islandica
- Hooded merganser, Lophodytes cucullatus
- Common merganser, Mergus merganser (n)
- Red-breasted merganser, Mergus serrator
- Masked duck, Nomonyx dominicus (H)
- Ruddy duck, Oxyura jamaicensis (n)

== New World quail ==
Order: Galliformes Family: Odontophoridae

The New World quails are small, plump terrestrial birds only distantly related to the quails of the Old World, but named for their similar appearance and habits.

- Masked bobwhite, Colinus virginianus ridgwayi (n) (Ex)
- Scaled quail, Callipepla squamata (n)
- California quail, Callipepla californica (n) (Int)
- Gambel's quail, Callipepla gambelii (n)
- Montezuma quail, Cyrtonyx montezumae (n)

== Pheasants, grouse, and allies ==
Order: Galliformes Family: Phasianidae

Phasianidae consists of the pheasants and their allies. These are terrestrial species, variable in size but generally plump with broad relatively short wings. Many species are gamebirds or have been domesticated as a food source for humans.

- Wild turkey, Meleagris gallopavo (n)
- White-tailed ptarmigan, Lagopus leucurus (H)
- Dusky grouse, Dendragapus obscurus (n)
- Greater sage-grouse, Centrocercus urophasianus (H)
- Ring-necked pheasant, Phasianus colchicus (n) (Int)
- Chukar, Alectoris chukar (n) (Int)

== Grebes ==
Order: Podicipediformes Family: Podicipedidae

Grebes are small to medium-large freshwater diving birds. They have lobed toes and are excellent swimmers and divers. However, they have their feet placed far back on the body, making them quite ungainly on land.

- Least grebe, Tachybaptus dominicus (n)
- Pied-billed grebe, Podilymbus podiceps (n)
- Horned grebe, Podiceps auritus
- Red-necked grebe, Podiceps grisegena
- Eared grebe, Podiceps nigricollis (n)
- Western grebe, Aechmophorus occidentalis (n)
- Clark's grebe, Aechmophorus clarkii (n)

== Pigeons and doves ==
Order: Columbiformes Family: Columbidae

Pigeons and doves are stout-bodied birds with short necks and short slender bills with a fleshy cere.

- Rock pigeon, Columba livia (n) (Int)
- Band-tailed pigeon, Patagioenas fasciata (n)
- Eurasian collared-dove, Streptopelia decaocto (n) (Int)
- Inca dove, Columbina inca (n)
- Common ground dove, Columbina passerina (n)
- Ruddy ground dove, Columbina talpacoti (n)
- White-tipped dove, Leptotila verreauxi (A)
- White-winged dove, Zenaida asiatica (n)
- Mourning dove, Zenaida macroura (n)

== Cuckoos ==
Order: Cuculiformes Family: Cuculidae

The family Cuculidae includes cuckoos, roadrunners, and anis. These birds are of variable size with slender bodies, long tails, and strong legs.

- Groove-billed ani, Crotophaga sulcirostris
- Greater roadrunner, Geococcyx californianus (n)
- Yellow-billed cuckoo, Coccyzus americanus (n)
- Black-billed cuckoo, Coccyzus erythrophthalmus (A)

== Nightjars and allies ==
Order: Caprimulgiformes Family: Caprimulgidae

Nightjars are medium-sized nocturnal birds that usually nest on the ground. They have long wings, short legs, and very short bills. Most have small feet, of little use for walking, and long pointed wings. Their soft plumage is cryptically colored to resemble bark or leaves.

- Lesser nighthawk, Chordeiles acutipennis (n)
- Common nighthawk, Chordeiles minor (n)
- Common poorwill, Phalaenoptilus nuttallii (n)
- Buff-collared nightjar, Antrostomus ridgwayi (n)
- Eastern whip-poor-will, Antrostomus vociferus (A)
- Mexican whip-poor-will, Antrostomus arizonae (n)

== Swifts ==
Order: Apodiformes Family: Apodidae

The swifts are small birds which spend the majority of their lives flying. These birds have very short legs and never settle voluntarily on the ground, perching instead only on vertical surfaces. Many swifts have long swept-back wings which resemble a crescent or boomerang.

- Black swift, Cypseloides niger (A)
- Chimney swift, Chaetura pelagica (A)
- Vaux's swift, Chaetura vauxi
- White-throated swift, Aeronautes saxatalis (n)

== Hummingbirds ==
Order: Apodiformes Family: Trochilidae

Hummingbirds are small birds capable of hovering in mid-air due to the rapid flapping of their wings. They are the only birds that can fly backwards.

- Rivoli's hummingbird, Eugenes fulgens (n)
- Plain-capped starthroat, Heliomaster constantii
- Blue-throated mountain-gem, Lampornis clemenciae (n)
- Lucifer hummingbird, Calothorax lucifer (n)
- Ruby-throated hummingbird, Archilochus colubris (A)
- Black-chinned hummingbird, Archilochus alexandri (n)
- Anna's hummingbird, Calypte anna (n)
- Costa's hummingbird, Calypte costae (n)
- Calliope hummingbird, Selasphorus calliope
- Rufous hummingbird, Selasphorus rufus
- Allen's hummingbird, Selasphorus sasin
- Broad-tailed hummingbird, Selasphorus platycercus (n)
- Bumblebee hummingbird, Atthis heloisa (A)
- Broad-billed hummingbird, Cynanthus latirostris (n)
- White-eared hummingbird, Basilinna leucotis (n)
- Violet-crowned hummingbird, Leucolia violiceps (n)
- Berylline hummingbird, Saucerottia beryllina (n)
- Cinnamon hummingbird, Amazilia rutila (A)

== Rails, gallinules, and coots ==
Order: Gruiformes Family: Rallidae

Rallidae is a large family of small to medium-sized birds which includes the rails, crakes, coots, and gallinules. The most typical family members occupy dense vegetation in damp environments near lakes, swamps, or rivers. In general they are shy and secretive birds, making them difficult to observe. Most species have strong legs and long toes which are well adapted to soft uneven surfaces. They tend to have short, rounded wings and to be weak fliers.

- Ridgway's rail, Rallus obsoletus (n)
- Virginia rail, Rallus limicola (n)
- Sora, Porzana carolina (n)
- Common gallinule, Gallinula galeata (n)
- American coot, Fulica americana (n)
- Purple gallinule, Porphyrio martinicus (A)
- Black rail, Laterallus jamaicensis (n)

== Cranes ==
Order: Gruiformes Family: Gruidae

Cranes are large, long-legged, and long-necked birds. Unlike the similar-looking but unrelated herons, cranes fly with necks outstretched, not pulled back. Most have elaborate and noisy courting displays or "dances".

- Sandhill crane, Antigone canadensis (n)
- Common crane, Grus grus (A)
- Whooping crane, Grus americana (H)

== Thick-knees ==
Order: Charadriiformes Family: Burhinidae

The thick-knees are a group of waders found worldwide within the tropical zone, with some species also breeding in temperate Europe and Australia. They are medium to large waders with strong black or yellow-black bills, large yellow eyes, and cryptic plumage. Despite being classed as waders, most species have a preference for arid or semi-arid habitats.

- Double-striped thick-knee, Burhinus bistriatus (H)

== Stilts and avocets ==
Order: Charadriiformes Family: Recurvirostridae

Recurvirostridae is a family of large wading birds which includes the avocets and stilts. The avocets have long legs and long up-curved bills. The stilts have extremely long legs and long, thin, straight bills.

- Black-necked stilt, Himantopus mexicanus (n)
- American avocet, Recurvirostra americana (n)

== Plovers and lapwings ==
Order: Charadriiformes Family: Charadriidae

The family Charadriidae includes the plovers, dotterels, and lapwings. They are small to medium-sized birds with compact bodies, short thick necks, and long, usually pointed, wings. They are found in open country worldwide, mostly in habitats near water.

- Black-bellied plover, Pluvialis squatarola
- American golden-plover, Pluvialis dominica
- Pacific golden-plover, Pluvialis fulva (A)
- Killdeer, Charadrius vociferus (n)
- Semipalmated plover, Charadrius semipalmatus
- Lesser sand-plover, Charadrius mongolus (A)
- Mountain plover, Charadrius montanus (n)
- Snowy plover, Charadrius nivosus (n)

== Jacanas ==
Order: Charadriiformes Family: Jacanidae

The jacanas are a family of waders found worldwide within the tropical zone. They are identifiable by their huge feet and claws which enable them to walk on floating vegetation in the shallow lakes that are their preferred habitat.

- Northern jacana, Jacana spinosa (A)

== Sandpipers and allies ==
Order: Charadriiformes Family: Scolopacidae

Scolopacidae is a large diverse family of small to medium-sized shorebirds including the sandpipers, curlews, godwits, shanks, tattlers, woodcocks, snipes, dowitchers, and phalaropes. The majority of these species eat small invertebrates picked out of the mud or soil. Different lengths of legs and bills enable multiple species to feed in the same habitat, particularly on the coast, without direct competition for food.

- Upland sandpiper, Bartramia longicauda (A)
- Whimbrel, Numenius phaeopus
- Long-billed curlew, Numenius americanus (n)
- Hudsonian godwit, Limosa haemastica (A)
- Marbled godwit, Limosa fedoa
- Ruddy turnstone, Arenaria interpres (A)
- Black turnstone, Arenaria melanocephala (A)
- Red knot, Calidris canutus (A)
- Ruff, Calidris pugnax (A)
- Sharp-tailed sandpiper, Calidris acuminata (A)
- Stilt sandpiper, Calidris himantopus
- Curlew sandpiper, Calidris ferruginea (A)
- Sanderling, Calidris alba
- Dunlin, Calidris alpina
- Baird's sandpiper, Calidris bairdii
- Least sandpiper, Calidris minutilla
- White-rumped sandpiper, Calidris fuscicollis (A)
- Buff-breasted sandpiper, Calidris subruficollis (A)
- Pectoral sandpiper, Calidris melanotos
- Semipalmated sandpiper, Calidris pusilla
- Western sandpiper, Calidris mauri
- Short-billed dowitcher, Limnodromus griseus
- Long-billed dowitcher, Limnodromus scolopaceus
- American woodcock, Scolopax minor (A)
- Wilson's snipe, Gallinago delicata (n)
- Spotted sandpiper, Actitis macularia (n)
- Solitary sandpiper, Tringa solitaria
- Wandering tattler, Tringa incana (A)
- Lesser yellowlegs, Tringa melanoleuca
- Willet, Tringa semipalmata
- Greater yellowlegs, Tringa flavipes
- Wilson's phalarope, Phalaropus tricolor (n)
- Red-necked phalarope, Phalaropus lobatus
- Red phalarope, Phalaropus fulicaria

== Skuas and jaegers ==
Order: Charadriiformes Family: Stercorariidae

Skuas and jaegers are in general medium to large birds, typically with gray or brown plumage, often with white markings on the wings. They have longish bills with hooked tips and webbed feet with sharp claws. They look like large dark gulls, but have a fleshy cere above the upper mandible. They are strong, acrobatic fliers.

- Pomarine jaeger, Stercorarius pomarinus (A)
- Parasitic jaeger, Stercorarius parasiticus (A)
- Long-tailed jaeger, Stercorarius longicaudus (A)

== Gulls, terns, and skimmers ==
Order: Charadriiformes Family: Laridae

Laridae is a family of medium to large seabirds and includes gulls, terns, and skimmers. Gulls are typically gray or white, often with black markings on the head or wings. They have stout, longish bills and webbed feet. Terns are a group of generally medium to large seabirds typically with grey or white plumage, often with black markings on the head. Most terns hunt fish by diving but some pick insects off the surface of fresh water. Terns are generally long-lived birds, with several species known to live in excess of 30 years. Skimmers are a small family of tropical tern-like birds. They have an elongated lower mandible which they use to feed by flying low over the water surface and skimming the water for small fish.

- Black-legged kittiwake, Rissa tridactyla (A)
- Ivory gull, Pagophila eburnea (A)
- Sabine's gull, Xema sabini
- Bonaparte's gull, Chroicocephalus philadelphia
- Little gull, Hydrocoloeus minutus (A)
- Laughing gull, Leucophaeus atricilla
- Franklin's gull, Leucophaeus pipixcan
- Heermann's gull, Larus heermanni
- Short-billed gull, Larus brachyrhynchus
- Ring-billed gull, Larus delawarensis
- Western gull, Larus occidentalis (A)
- Yellow-footed gull, Larus livens (A)
- California gull, Larus californicus
- Herring gull, Larus argentatus
- Iceland gull, Larus glaucoides (A)
- Lesser black-backed gull, Larus fuscus (A)
- Glaucous-winged gull, Larus glaucescens (A)
- Glaucous gull, Larus hyperboreus (A)
- Least tern, Sternula antillarum (n)
- Gull-billed tern, Gelochelidon nilotica (A)
- Caspian tern, Hydroprogne caspia
- Black tern, Chlidonias niger
- Common tern, Sterna hirundo
- Arctic tern, Sterna paradisaea (A)
- Forster's tern, Sterna forsteri
- Royal tern, Thalasseus maximus (A)
- Elegant tern, Thalasseus elegans (A)
- Black skimmer, Rynchops niger (A)

== Tropicbirds ==
Order: Phaethontiformes Family: Phaethontidae

Tropicbirds are slender white birds of tropical oceans with exceptionally long central tail feathers. Their long wings have black markings, as does the head.

- White-tailed tropicbird, Phaethon lepturus (A)
- Red-billed tropicbird, Phaethon rubicauda (A)

== Loons ==
Order: Gaviiformes Family: Gaviidae

Loons are aquatic birds, the size of a large duck, to which they are unrelated. Their plumage is largely gray or black, and they have spear-shaped bills. Loons swim well and fly adequately, but are almost hopeless on land, because their legs are placed towards the rear of the body.

- Red-throated loon, Gavia stellata
- Pacific loon, Gavia pacifica
- Common loon, Gavia immer
- Yellow-billed loon, Gavia adamsii (A)

== Albatrosses ==
Order: Procellariiformes Family: Diomedeidae

The albatrosses are among the largest of flying birds, and the great albatrosses of the genus Diomedea have the largest wingspans of any extant birds.

- Laysan albatross, Phoebastria immutabilis (A)

== Northern storm-petrels ==
Order: Procellariiformes Family: Hydrobatidae

The storm-petrels are the smallest seabirds, relatives of the petrels, feeding on planktonic crustaceans and small fish picked from the surface, typically while hovering. The flight is fluttering and sometimes bat-like.

- Leach's storm-petrel/Townsend's storm-petrel/Ainley's storm-petrel, Hydrobates leucorhous/socorroensis/cheimomnestes (A) (H)
- Wedge-rumped storm-petrel, Hydrobates tethys (A)
- Black storm-petrel, Hydrobates melania (A)
- Least storm-petrel, Hydrobates microsoma (A)

== Shearwaters and petrels ==
Order: Procellariiformes Family: Procellariidae

The procellariids are the main group of medium-sized "true petrels", characterized by united nostrils with medium septum and a long outer functional primary.

- Juan Fernandez petrel, Pterodroma externa (A)
- Hawaiian petrel, Pterodroma sandwichensis (A)
- Wedge-tailed shearwater, Ardenna pacificus (A)
- Sooty shearwater, Ardenna griseus (A)
- Black-vented shearwater, Puffinus opisthomelas (A) (H)

== Storks ==
Order: Ciconiiformes Family: Ciconiidae

Storks are large, heavy, long-legged, long-necked wading birds with long stout bills and wide wingspans. They lack the powder down that other wading birds such as herons, spoonbills, and ibises use to clean off fish slime. Storks lack a pharynx and are mute.

- Wood stork, Mycteria americana (A)

== Frigatebirds ==
Order: Suliformes Family: Fregatidae

Frigatebirds are large seabirds usually found over tropical oceans. They are large, black, or black-and-white, with long wings and deeply forked tails. The males have colored inflatable throat pouches. They do not swim or walk and cannot take off from a flat surface. Having the largest wingspan-to-body-weight ratio of any bird, they are essentially aerial, able to stay aloft for more than a week.

- Magnificent frigatebird, Fregata magnificens (A)

== Boobies and gannets ==
Order: Suliformes Family: Sulidae

The sulids comprise the gannets and boobies. Both groups are medium-large coastal seabirds that plunge-dive for fish.

- Blue-footed booby, Sula nebouxii (A)
- Brown booby, Sula leucogaster (A)

== Anhingas ==
Order: Suliformes Family: Anhingidae

Anhingas are cormorant-like water birds with very long necks and long straight bills. They are fish eaters which often swim with only their neck above the water.

- Anhinga, Anhinga anhinga (A)

== Cormorants and shags ==
Order: Suliformes Family: Phalacrocoracidae

Cormorants are medium-to-large aquatic birds, usually with mainly dark plumage and areas of colored skin on the face. The bill is long, thin, and sharply hooked. Their feet are four-toed and webbed.

- Brandt's cormorant, Urile penicillatus (H)
- Double-crested cormorant, Nannopterum auritum (n)
- Neotropic cormorant, Nannopterum brasilianum (n)

== Pelicans ==
Order: Pelecaniformes Family: Pelecanidae

Pelicans are very large water birds with a distinctive pouch under their bill. Like other birds in the order Pelecaniformes, they have four webbed toes.

- American white pelican, Pelecanus erythrorhynchos
- Brown pelican, Pelecanus occidentalis

== Herons, egrets, and bitterns ==
Order: Pelecaniformes Family: Ardeidae

The family Ardeidae contains the herons, egrets, and bitterns. Herons and egrets are medium to large wading birds with long necks and legs. Bitterns tend to be shorter necked and more secretive. Members of Ardeidae fly with their necks retracted, unlike other long-necked birds such as storks, ibises, and spoonbills.

- American bittern, Botaurus lentiginosa (n)
- Least bittern, Ixobrychus exilis (n)
- Great blue heron, Ardea herodias (n)
- Great egret, Ardea alba (n)
- Snowy egret, Egretta thula (n)
- Little blue heron, Egretta caerulea
- Tricolored heron, Egretta tricolor
- Reddish egret, Egretta rufescens
- Cattle egret, Bubulcus ibis (n)
- Green heron, Butorides virescens (n)
- Black-crowned night-heron, Nycticorax nycticorax (n)
- Yellow-crowned night-heron, Nycticorax violaceus (A)

== Ibises and spoonbills ==
Order: Pelecaniformes Family: Threskiornithidae

The family Threskiornithidae includes the ibises and spoonbills. They have long, broad wings. Their bodies tend to be elongated, the neck more so, with rather long legs. The bill is also long, decurved in the case of the ibises, straight and distinctively flattened in the spoonbills.

- White ibis, Eudocimus albus (A)
- Glossy ibis, Plegadis falcinellus (A)
- White-faced ibis, Plegadis chihi (n)
- Roseate spoonbill, Platalea ajaja

== New World vultures ==
Order: Cathartiformes Family: Cathartidae

The New World vultures are not closely related to Old World vultures, but superficially resemble them because of convergent evolution. Like the Old World vultures, they are scavengers. However, unlike Old World vultures, which find carcasses by sight, New World vultures have a good sense of smell with which they locate carcasses.

- California condor, Gymnogyps californianus (n) (Ex) (reintroduced 1996 after a century of extirpation, first successful nesting attempt 2003)
- Black vulture, Coragyps atratus (n)
- Turkey vulture, Cathartes aura (n)

== Osprey ==
Order: Accipitriformes Family: Pandionidae

Pandionidae is a monotypic family of fish-eating birds of prey. Its single species possesses a very large and powerful hooked bill strong legs, strong talons, and keen eyesight.

- Osprey, Pandion haliaetus (n)

== Hawks, eagles, and kites ==
Order: Accipitriformes Family: Accipitridae

Accipitridae is a family of birds of prey which includes hawks, eagles, kites, harriers, and Old World vultures. These birds have very large powerful hooked bills for tearing flesh from their prey, strong legs, powerful talons, and keen eyesight.

- White-tailed kite, Elanus leucurus (n)
- Swallow-tailed kite, Elanoides forficatus (A)
- Golden eagle, Aquila chrysaetos (n)
- Northern harrier, Circus hudsonius (n)
- Sharp-shinned hawk, Accipiter striatus (n)
- Cooper's hawk, Accipiter cooperii (n)
- American goshawk, Accipiter atricapillus (n)
- Bald eagle, Haliaeetus leucocephalus (n)
- Mississippi kite, Ictinia mississippiensis (n)
- Common black hawk, Buteogallus anthracinus (n)
- Harris's hawk, Parabuteo unicinctus (n)
- White-tailed hawk, Geranoaetus albicaudatus (A)
- Gray hawk, Buteo plagiatus (n)
- Red-shouldered hawk, Buteo lineatus (n)
- Broad-winged hawk, Buteo platypterus
- Short-tailed hawk, Buteo brachyurus (n)
- Swainson's hawk, Buteo swainsoni (n)
- Zone-tailed hawk, Buteo albonotatus (n)
- Red-tailed hawk, Buteo jamaicensis (n)
- Rough-legged hawk, Buteo lagopus
- Ferruginous hawk, Buteo regalis (n)

== Barn-owls ==
Order: Strigiformes Family: Tytonidae

Owls in the family Tytonidae are medium to large owls with large heads and characteristic heart-shaped faces.

- Barn owl, Tyto alba (n)

== Owls ==
Order: Strigiformes Family: Strigidae

Typical or "true" owls are small to large solitary nocturnal birds of prey. They have large forward-facing eyes and ears, a hawk-like beak, and a conspicuous circle of feathers around each eye called a facial disk.

- Flammulated owl, Psiloscops flammeolus (n)
- Whiskered screech-owl, Megascops trichopsis (n)
- Western screech-owl, Megascops kennicottii (n)
- Great horned owl, Bubo virginianus (n)
- Northern pygmy-owl, Glaucidium gnoma (n)
- Ferruginous pygmy-owl, Glaucidium brasilianum (n)
- Elf owl, Micrathene whitneyi (n)
- Burrowing owl, Athene cunicularia (n)
- Spotted owl, Strix occidentalis (n)
- Long-eared owl, Asio otus (n)
- Short-eared owl, Asio flammeus
- Northern saw-whet owl, Aegolius acadicus (n)

== Trogons ==
Order: Trogoniformes Family: Trogonidae

Trogons are residents of tropical forests worldwide with the greatest diversity in Central and South America. They feed on insects and fruit, and their broad bills and weak legs reflect their diet and arboreal habits. Although their flight is fast, they are reluctant to fly any distance. Trogons do not migrate. Trogons have soft, often colorful, feathers with distinctive male and female plumage. They nest in holes in trees or termite nests, laying white or pastel-colored eggs.

- Elegant trogon, Trogon elegans (n)
- Eared quetzal, Euptilotis neoxenus (n) (A)

== Kingfishers ==
Order: Coraciiformes Family: Alcedinidae

Kingfishers are medium-sized birds with large heads, long, pointed bills, short legs, and stubby tails.

- Ringed Kingfisher, Megaceryle torquata (A)
- Belted kingfisher, Megaceryle alcyon (n)
- Green kingfisher, Chloroceryle americana (n)

== Woodpeckers ==
Order: Piciformes Family: Picidae

Woodpeckers are small to medium-sized birds with chisel-like bills, short legs, stiff tails, and long tongues used for capturing insects. Some species have feet with two toes pointing forward and two backward, while several species have only three toes. Many woodpeckers have the habit of tapping noisily on tree trunks with their bills.

- Lewis's woodpecker, Melanerpes lewis (n)
- Red-headed woodpecker, Melanerpes erythrocephalus (A)
- Acorn woodpecker, Melanerpes formicivorus (n)
- Gila woodpecker, Melanerpes uropygialis (n)
- Williamson's sapsucker, Sphyrapicus thyroideus (n)
- Yellow-bellied sapsucker, Sphyrapicus varius
- Red-naped sapsucker, Sphyrapicus nuchalis (n)
- Red-breasted sapsucker, Sphyrapicus ruber
- American three-toed woodpecker, Picoides dorsalis (n)
- Downy woodpecker, Dryobates pubescens (n)
- Nuttall's woodpecker, Dryobates nuttallii (H)
- Ladder-backed woodpecker, Dryobates scalaris (n)
- Hairy woodpecker, Dryobates villosus (n)
- White-headed woodpecker, Dryobates albolarvatus (H)
- Arizona woodpecker, Dryobates arizonae (n)
- Northern flicker, Colaptes auratus (n)
- Gilded flicker, Colaptes chrysoides (n)

== Falcons and caracaras ==
Order: Falconiformes Family: Falconidae

Falconidae is a family of diurnal birds of prey, notably the falcons and caracaras. They differ from hawks, eagles, and kites in that they kill with their bills instead of their talons.

- Crested caracara, Caracara plancus (n)
- American kestrel, Falco sparverius (n)
- Merlin, Falco columbarius
- Aplomado falcon, Falco femoralis (n) (A) (Ex)
- Peregrine falcon, Falco peregrinus (n)
- Prairie falcon, Falco mexicanus (n)

== New World and African parrots ==
Order: Psittaciformes Family: Psittacidae

Characteristic features of parrots include a strong curved bill, an upright stance, strong legs, and clawed zygodactyl feet. Many parrots are vividly colored, and some are multi-colored. In size they range from 8 cm (3.1 in) to 1 m (3.3 ft) in length. Most of the more than 150 species in this family are found in the New World.

- Military macaw, Ara militaris (H)
- Thick-billed parrot, Rhynchopsitta pachyrhyncha (n) (A) (Ex) (attempts at reintroduction in the 1980s failed)

== Old World parrots ==
Order: Psittaciformes Family: Psittaculidae

Characteristic features of parrots include a strong curved bill, an upright stance, strong legs, and clawed zygodactyl feet. Many parrots are vividly colored, and some are multi-colored. In size they range from 8 cm (3.1 in) to 1 m (3.3 ft) in length. Old World parrots are found from Africa east across south and southeast Asia and Oceania to Australia and New Zealand.

- Rosy-faced lovebird, Agapornis roseicollis (n) (Int)

== Tityras and allies ==
Order: Passeriformes Family: Tityridae

Tityridae is family of suboscine passerine birds found in forest and woodland in the Neotropics. The approximately 30 species in this family were formerly lumped with the families Pipridae and Cotingidae (see Taxonomy). As yet, no widely accepted common name exists for the family, although Tityras and allies and Tityras, mourners, and allies have been used. They are small to medium-sized birds.

- Gray-collared becard, Pachyramphus major (A)
- Rose-throated becard, Pachyramphus aglaiae (n)

== Tyrant flycatchers ==
Order: Passeriformes Family: Tyrannidae

Tyrant flycatchers are Passerine birds which occur throughout North and South America. They superficially resemble the Old World flycatchers, but are more robust and have stronger bills. They do not have the sophisticated vocal capabilities of the songbirds. Most, but not all, are rather plain. As the name implies, most are insectivorous.

- Northern beardless-tyrannulet, Camptostoma imberbe (n)
- Dusky-capped flycatcher, Myiarchus tuberculifer (n)
- Ash-throated flycatcher, Myiarchus cinerascens (n)
- Nutting's flycatcher, Myiarchus nuttingi (n) (A)
- Great crested flycatcher, Myiarchus crinitus (A)
- Brown-crested flycatcher, Myiarchus tyrannulus (n)
- Great kiskadee, Pitangus sulphuratus (A)
- Sulphur-bellied flycatcher, Myiodynastes luteiventris (n)
- Tropical kingbird, Tyrannus melancholicus (n)
- Couch's kingbird, Tyrannus couchii (A)
- Cassin's kingbird, Tyrannus vociferans (n)
- Thick-billed kingbird, Tyrannus crassirostris (n)
- Western kingbird, Tyrannus verticalis (n)
- Eastern kingbird, Tyrannus tyrannus
- Scissor-tailed flycatcher, Tyrannus forficatus
- Tufted flycatcher, Mitrephanes phaeocercus (n) (A)
- Olive-sided flycatcher, Contopus cooperi (n)
- Greater pewee, Contopus pertinax (n)
- Western wood-pewee, Contopus sordidulus (n)
- Eastern wood-pewee, Contopus virens (A)
- Yellow-bellied flycatcher, Empidonax flaviventris (A)
- Acadian flycatcher, Empidonax virescens (A)
- Willow flycatcher, Empidonax traillii (n)
- Least flycatcher, Empidonax minimus (A)
- Hammond's flycatcher, Empidonax hammondii (n)
- Gray flycatcher, Empidonax wrightii (n)
- Dusky flycatcher, Empidonax oberholseri (n)
- Pine flycatcher, Empidonax affinis (A)
- Western flycatcher, Empidonax difficilis
- Buff-breasted flycatcher, Empidonax fulvifrons (n)
- Black phoebe, Sayornis nigricans (n)
- Eastern phoebe, Sayornis phoebe
- Say's phoebe, Sayornis saya (n)
- Vermilion flycatcher, Pyrocephalus rubinus (n)

== Vireos, shrike-babblers, and erpornis ==
Order: Passeriformes Family: Vireonidae

The vireos are a group of small to medium-sized passerine birds mostly restricted to the New World, though a few other species in the family are found in Asia. They are typically greenish in color and resemble wood-warblers apart from their heavier bills.

- Black-capped vireo, Vireo atricapilla (A)
- White-eyed vireo, Vireo griseus
- Bell's vireo, Vireo bellii (n)
  - Eastern (bellii) form (A)
- Gray vireo, Vireo vicinior (n)
- Hutton's vireo, Vireo huttoni (n)
- Yellow-throated vireo, Vireo flavifrons
- Cassin's vireo, Vireo cassinii
- Blue-headed vireo, Vireo solitarius (A)
- Plumbeous vireo, Vireo plumbeus (n)
- Philadelphia vireo, Vireo philadelphicus (A)
- Warbling vireo, Vireo gilvus (n)
- Red-eyed vireo, Vireo olivaceus
- Yellow-green vireo, Vireo flavoviridis (A)

== Shrikes ==
Order: Passeriformes Family: Laniidae

Shrikes are passerine birds known for their habit of catching other birds and small animals and impaling the uneaten portions of their bodies on thorns. A shrike's bill is hooked, like that of a typical bird of prey.

- Loggerhead shrike, Lanius ludovicianus (n)
- Northern shrike, Lanius borealis

== Crows, jays, and magpies ==
Order: Passeriformes Family: Corvidae

The family Corvidae includes crows, ravens, jays, choughs, magpies, treepies, nutcrackers, and ground jays. Corvids are above average in size among the Passeriformes, and some of the larger species show high levels of intelligence.

- Canada jay, Perisoreus canadensis (n)
- Pinyon jay, Gymnorhinus cyanocephalus (n)
- Steller's jay, Cyanocitta stelleri (n)
- Blue jay, Cyanocitta cristata (A)
- California scrub-jay, Aphelocoma californica (A)
- Woodhouse's scrub-jay, Aphelocoma woodhouseii (n)
- Mexican jay, Aphelocoma ultramarina (n)
- Clark's nutcracker, Nucifraga columbiana (n)
- Black-billed magpie, Pica hudsonia (n)
- Yellow-billed magpie, Pica nuttalli (H)
- American crow, Corvus brachyrhynchos (n)
- Chihuahuan raven, Corvus cryptoleucos (n)
- Common raven, Corvus corax (n)

== Penduline-tits ==
Order: Passeriformes Family: Remizidae

The only member of this family in the New World, the verdin is one of the smallest passerines in North America. It is gray overall and adults have a bright yellow head and rufous "shoulder patch" (the lesser coverts). Verdins are insectivorous, continuously foraging among the desert trees and scrubs. They are usually solitary except when they pair up to construct their conspicuous nests.

- Verdin, Auriparus flaviceps (n)

== Tits, chickadees, and titmice ==
Order: Passeriformes Family: Paridae

The Paridae are mainly small stocky woodland species with short stout bills. Some have crests. They are adaptable birds, with a mixed diet including seeds and insects.

- Black-capped chickadee, Poecile atricapillus (n) (A)
- Mountain chickadee, Poecile gambeli (n)
- Mexican chickadee, Poecile sclateri (n)
- Bridled titmouse, Baeolophus wollweberi (n)
- Juniper titmouse, Baeolophus ridgwayi (n)

== Larks ==
Order: Passeriformes Family: Alaudidae

Larks are small terrestrial birds with often extravagant songs and display flights. Most larks are fairly dull in appearance. Their food is insects and seeds.

- Horned lark, Eremophila alpestris (n)

== Swallows ==
Order: Passeriformes Family: Hirundinidae

The family Hirundinidae is adapted to aerial feeding. They have a slender streamlined body, long pointed wings, and a short bill with a wide gape. The feet are adapted to perching rather than walking, and the front toes are partially joined at the base.

- Bank swallow, Riparia riparia
- Tree swallow, Tachycineta bicolor (n)
- Violet-green swallow, Tachycineta thalassina (n)
- Northern rough-winged swallow, Stelgidopteryx serripennis (n)
- Brown-chested martin, Progne tapera (A)
- Purple martin, Progne subis (n)
- Barn swallow, Hirundo rustica (n)
- Cliff swallow, Petrochelidon pyrrhonota (n)
- Cave swallow, Petrochelidon fulva (n) (A)

== Long-tailed tits ==
Order: Passeriformes Family: Aegithalidae

The long-tailed tits are a family of small passerine birds with medium to long tails. They make woven bag nests in trees. Most eat a mixed diet which includes insects.

- Bushtit, Psaltriparus minimus (n)

== Kinglets ==
Order: Passeriformes Family: Regulidae

The kinglets and "crests" are a small family of birds which resemble some warblers. They are very small insectivorous birds. The adults have colored crowns, giving rise to their name.

- Ruby-crowned kinglet, Corthylio calendula (n)
- Golden-crowned kinglet, Regulus satrapa (n)

== Waxwings ==
Order: Passeriformes Family: Bombycillidae

The waxwings are a group of passerine birds with soft silky plumage and unique red tips to some of the wing feathers. In the Bohemian and cedar waxwings, these tips look like sealing wax and give the group its name. These are arboreal birds of northern forests. They live on insects in summer and berries in winter.

- Bohemian waxwing, Bombycilla garrulus (A)
- Cedar waxwing, Bombycilla cedrorum

== Silky-flycatchers ==
Order: Passeriformes Family: Ptiliogonatidae

The silky-flycatchers are a small family of passerine birds which occur mainly in Central America. They are related to waxwings and most species have small crests.

- Phainopepla, Phainopepla nitens (n)

== Nuthatches ==
Order: Passeriformes Family: Sittidae

Nuthatches are small woodland birds. They have the unusual ability to climb down trees head first, unlike other birds which can only go upwards. Nuthatches have big heads, short tails, and powerful bills and feet.

- Red-breasted nuthatch, Sitta canadensis (n)
- White-breasted nuthatch, Sitta carolinensis (n)
- Pygmy nuthatch, Sitta pygmaea (n)

== Treecreepers ==
Order: Passeriformes Family: Certhiidae

Treecreepers are small woodland birds, brown above and white below. They have thin pointed down-curved bills, which they use to extricate insects from bark. They have stiff tail feathers, like woodpeckers, which they use to support themselves on vertical trees

- Brown creeper, Certhia americana (n)

== Gnatcatchers ==
Order: Passeriformes Family: Polioptilidae

These dainty birds resemble Old World warblers in their structure and habits, moving restlessly through the foliage seeking insects. The gnatcatchers are mainly soft bluish gray in color and have the typical insectivore's long sharp bill. Many species have distinctive black head patterns (especially males) and long, regularly cocked, black-and-white tails.

- Blue-gray gnatcatcher, Polioptila caerulea (n)
- Black-tailed gnatcatcher, Polioptila melanura (n)
- Black-capped gnatcatcher, Polioptila nigriceps (n)

== Wrens ==
Order: Passeriformes Family: Troglodytidae

Wrens are small and inconspicuous birds, except for their loud songs. They have short wings and thin down-turned bills. Several species often hold their tails upright. All are insectivorous.

- Rock wren, Salpinctes obsoletus (n)
- Canyon wren, Catherpes mexicanus (n)
- House wren, Troglodytes aedon (n)
- Pacific wren, Troglodytes pacificus (n)
- Winter wren, Troglodytes hiemalis
- Sedge wren, Cistothorus platensis (A)
- Marsh wren, Cistothorus palustris (n)
- Carolina wren, Thryothorus ludovicianus (A)
- Bewick's wren, Thryomanes bewickii (n)
- Cactus wren, Campylorhynchus brunneicapillus (n)
- Sinaloa wren, Thryophilus sinaloa (A)

== Mockingbirds and thrashers ==
Order: Passeriformes Family: Mimidae

The mimids are a family of passerine birds which includes thrashers, mockingbirds, tremblers, and the New World catbirds. These birds are notable for their vocalization, especially their remarkable ability to mimic a wide variety of birds and other sounds heard outdoors. The species tend towards dull grays and browns in their appearance.

- Blue mockingbird, Melanotis caerulescens (A)
- Gray catbird, Dumetella carolinensis (n)
- Curve-billed thrasher, Toxostoma curvirostre (n)
- Brown thrasher, Toxostoma rufum
- Bendire's thrasher, Toxostoma bendirei (n)
- LeConte's thrasher, Toxostoma lecontei (n)
- Crissal thrasher, Toxostoma crissale (n)
- Sage thrasher, Oreoscoptes montanus (n)
- Northern mockingbird, Mimus polyglottos (n)

== Starlings ==
Order: Passeriformes Family: Sturnidae Starlings and mynas are small to medium-sized Old World passerine birds with strong feet. Their flight is strong and direct and most are very gregarious. Their preferred habitat is fairly open country, and they eat insects and fruit. The plumage of several species is dark with a metallic sheen.

- European starling, Sturnus vulgaris (n) (Int)

== Dippers ==
Order: Passeriformes Family: Cinclidae

Dippers are a group of perching birds whose habitat includes aquatic environments in the Americas, Europe, and Asia. They are named for their bobbing or dipping movements. These birds have adaptations which allows them to submerge and walk on the bottom to feed on insect larvae.

- American dipper, Cinclus mexicanus (n)

== Thrushes and allies ==
Order: Passeriformes Family: Turdidae

The thrushes are a group of passerine birds that occur mainly but not exclusively in the Old World. They are plump, soft plumaged, small to medium-sized insectivores or sometimes omnivores, often feeding on the ground. Many have attractive songs.

- Eastern bluebird, Sialia sialis (n)
- Western bluebird, Sialia mexicana (n)
- Mountain bluebird, Sialia currucoides (n)
- Townsend's solitaire, Myadestes townsendi (n)
- Brown-backed solitaire, Myadestes occidentalis (A)
- Orange-billed nightingale-thrush, Catharus aurantiirostris (A) (record is under committee review)
- Veery, Catharus fuscescens (n) (A)
- Gray-cheeked thrush, Catharus minimus (A)
- Swainson's thrush, Catharus ustulatus (n)
- Hermit thrush, Catharus guttatus (n)
- Wood thrush, Hylocichla mustelina (A)
- Clay-colored thrush, Turdus grayi (A)
- White-throated thrush, Turdus assimilis (A)
- Rufous-backed robin, Turdus rufopalliatus (n)
- American robin, Turdus migratorius (n)
- Varied thrush, Ixoreus naevius
- Aztec thrush, Ridgwayia pinicola (A)

== Old World flycatchers ==
Order: Passeriformes Family: Muscicapidae

The Old World flycatchers form a large family of small passerine birds. These are mainly small arboreal insectivores, many of which, as the name implies, take their prey on the wing.

- Northern wheatear, Oenanthe oenanthe (A)

== Olive warbler ==
Order: Passeriformes Family: Peucedramidae

The olive warbler has a gray body with some olive-green on the wings and two white wing bars. The male's head and breast are orange and there is a black patch through the eye. This is the only species in its family.

- Olive warbler, Peucedramus taeniatus (n)

== Old World sparrows ==
Order: Passeriformes Family: Passeridae

Old World sparrows are small passerine birds. In general, sparrows tend to be small plump brownish or grayish birds with short tails and short powerful bills. Sparrows are seed eaters, but they also consume small insects.

- House sparrow, Passer domesticus (n) (Int)

== Wagtails and pipits ==
Order: Passeriformes Family: Motacillidae

Motacillidae is a family of small passerine birds with medium to long tails. They include the wagtails, longclaws, and pipits. They are slender ground-feeding insectivores of open country.

- White wagtail, Motacilla alba (A)
- Red-throated pipit, Anthus cervinus (A)
- American pipit, Anthus rubescens (n)
- Sprague's pipit, Anthus spragueii

== Finches, euphonias, and allies ==
Order: Passeriformes Family: Fringillidae

Finches are seed-eating passerine birds that are small to moderately large and have a strong bill, usually conical and in some species very large. All have twelve tail feathers and nine primaries. These birds have a bouncing flight with alternating bouts of flapping and gliding on closed wings, and most sing well.

- Evening grosbeak, Coccothraustes vespertinus (n)
- Pine grosbeak, Pinicola enucleator (n)
- Gray-crowned rosy-finch, Leucosticte tephrocotis (A)
- Black rosy-finch, Leucosticte atrata (A)
- House finch, Haemorhous mexicanus (n)
- Purple finch, Haemorhous purpureus
  - Eastern (purpureus) group (A)
- Cassin's finch, Haemorhous cassinii (n)
- Common redpoll, Acanthis flammea (A)
- Red crossbill, Loxia curvirostra (n)
- White-winged crossbill, Loxia leucoptera (A)
- Pine siskin, Spinus pinus (n)
- Lesser goldfinch, Spinus psaltria (n)
- Lawrence's goldfinch, Spinus lawrencei (n)
- American goldfinch, Spinus tristis (n)

== Longspurs and snow buntings ==
Order: Passeriformes Family: Calcariidae

The Calcariidae are a group of passerine birds that had been traditionally grouped with the New World sparrows, but differ in a number of respects and are usually found in open grassy areas.

- Lapland longspur, Calcarius lapponicus
- Chestnut-collared longspur, Calcarius ornatus
- Smith's longspur, Calcarius pictus (A)
- Thick-billed longspur, Rhynchophanes mccownii
- Snow bunting, Plectophenax nivalis (A)

== Old World buntings ==
Order: Passeriformes Family: Emberizidae

Emberizidae is a family of passerine birds containing a single genus. Until 2017, the New World sparrows (Passerellidae) were also considered part of this family.

- Little bunting, Emberiza pusilla (A)

== New World sparrows ==
Order: Passeriformes Family: Passerellidae

Until 2017, these species were considered part of the family Emberizidae. Most of the species are known as sparrows, but these birds are not closely related to the Old World sparrows which are in the family Passeridae. Many of these have distinctive head patterns.

- Rufous-winged sparrow, Peucaea carpalis (n)
- Botteri's sparrow, Peucaea botterii (n)
- Cassin's sparrow, Peucaea cassinii (n)
- Grasshopper sparrow, Ammodramus savannarum (n)
- Five-striped sparrow, Amphispizopsis quinquestriata (n)
- Black-throated sparrow, Amphispiza bilineata (n)
- Lark sparrow, Chondestes grammacus (n)
- Lark bunting, Calamospiza melanocorys (n)
- Chipping sparrow, Spizella passerina (n)
- Clay-colored sparrow, Spizella pallida
- Black-chinned sparrow, Spizella atrogularis (n)
- Field sparrow, Spizella pusilla (A)
- Brewer's sparrow, Spizella breweri (n)
- Fox sparrow, Passerella iliaca
  - Thick-billed (megarhyncha) group (A)
- American tree sparrow, Spizelloides arborea (A)
- Dark-eyed junco, Junco hyemalis (n)
  - White-winged (aikeni) form (A)
- Yellow-eyed junco, Junco phaeonotus (n)
- White-crowned sparrow, Zonotrichia leucophrys (n)
- Golden-crowned sparrow, Zonotrichia atricapilla
- Harris's sparrow, Zonotrichia querula
- White-throated sparrow, Zonotrichia albicollis
- Sagebrush sparrow, Artemisiospiza nevadensis (n)
- Bell's sparrow, Artemisiospiza belli
- Vesper sparrow, Pooecetes gramineus (n)
- LeConte's sparrow, Ammospiza leconteii (A)
- Nelson's sparrow, Ammospiza nelsonii (A)
- Baird's sparrow, Centronyx bairdii
- Savannah sparrow, Passerculus sandwichensis (n)
  - Large-billed (rostratus) form (A)
- Song sparrow, Melospiza melodia (n)
- Lincoln's sparrow, Melospiza lincolnii (n)
- Swamp sparrow, Melospiza georgiana
- Canyon towhee, Melozone fuscus (n)
- Abert's towhee, Melozone aberti (n)
- Rufous-crowned sparrow, Aimophila ruficeps (n)
- Green-tailed towhee, Pipilo chlorurus (n)
- Spotted towhee, Pipilo maculatus (n)
- Eastern towhee, Pipilo erythrophthalmus (A)

== Yellow-breasted chat ==
Order: Passeriformes Family: Icteriidae

This species was historically placed in the wood-warblers (Parulidae) but nonetheless most authorities were unsure if it belonged there. It was placed in its own family in 2017.

- Yellow-breasted chat, Icteria virens (n)

== Troupials and allies ==
Order: Passeriformes Family: Icteridae

The icterids are a group of small to medium-sized, often colorful passerine birds restricted to the New World and include the grackles, New World blackbirds, and New World orioles. Most species have black as a predominant plumage color which is often enlivened by yellow, orange, or red.

- Yellow-headed blackbird, Xanthocephalus xanthocephalus (n)
- Bobolink, Dolichonyx oryzivorus (n) (A)
- Chihuahuan meadowlark, Sturnella lilianae (n)
- Western meadowlark, Sturnella neglecta (n)
- Black-vented oriole, Icterus wagleri (A)
- Orchard oriole, Icterus spurius
- Hooded oriole, Icterus cucullatus (n)
  - Eastern (cucullatus) group (A)
- Streak-backed oriole, Icterus pustulatus (n)
- Bullock's oriole, Icterus bullockii (n)
- Baltimore oriole, Icterus galbula
- Scott's oriole, Icterus parisorum (n)
- Red-winged blackbird, Agelaius phoeniceus (n)
- Bronzed cowbird, Molothrus aeneus (n)
- Brown-headed cowbird, Molothrus ater (n)
- Rusty blackbird, Euphagus carolinus
- Brewer's blackbird, Euphagus cyanocephalus (n)
- Common grackle, Quiscalus quiscula
- Great-tailed grackle, Quiscalus mexicanus (n)

== New World warblers ==
Order: Passeriformes Family: Parulidae

The wood-warblers are a group of small often colorful passerine birds restricted to the New World. Most are arboreal, but some are more terrestrial. Most members of this family are insectivores.

- Ovenbird, Seiurus aurocapilla
- Worm-eating warbler, Helmitheros vermivorum
- Louisiana waterthrush, Parkesia motacilla
- Northern waterthrush, Parkesia noveboracensis
- Golden-winged warbler, Vermivora chrysoptera (A)
- Blue-winged warbler, Vermivora cyanoptera (A)
- Black-and-white warbler, Mniotilta varia (n)
- Prothonotary warbler, Protonotaria citrea
- Swainson's warbler, Limnothlypis swainsonii (A)
- Crescent-chested warbler, Oreothlypis superciliosa (n) (A)
- Tennessee warbler, Leiothlypis peregrina
- Orange-crowned warbler, Leiothlypis celata (n)
- Lucy's warbler, Leiothlypis luciae (n)
- Nashville warbler, Leiothlypis ruficapilla
- Virginia's warbler, Leiothlypis virginiae (n)
- Connecticut warbler, Oporornis agilis (A)
- MacGillivray's warbler, Geothlypis tolmiei (n)
- Mourning warbler, Geothlypis philadelphia (A)
- Kentucky warbler, Geothlypis formosa
- Common yellowthroat, Geothlypis trichas (n)
- Hooded warbler, Setophaga citrina
- American redstart, Setophaga ruticilla (n)
- Cape May warbler, Setophaga tigrina (A)
- Cerulean warbler, Setophaga cerulea (A)
- Northern parula, Setophaga americana (n)
- Tropical parula, Setophaga pitiayumi (A)
- Magnolia warbler, Setophaga magnolia
- Bay-breasted warbler, Setophaga castanea (A)
- Blackburnian warbler, Setophaga fusca
- Yellow warbler, Setophaga petechia (n)
  - Mangrove (erithachorides) form (A)
- Chestnut-sided warbler, Setophaga pensylvanica
- Blackpoll warbler, Setophaga striata
- Black-throated blue warbler, Setophaga caerulescens
- Palm warbler, Setophaga palmarum
- Pine warbler, Setophaga pinus (A)
- Yellow-rumped warbler, Setophaga coronata (n)
- Yellow-throated warbler, Setophaga dominica
- Prairie warbler, Setophaga discolor (A)
- Grace's warbler, Setophaga graciae (n)
- Black-throated gray warbler, Setophaga nigrescens (n)
- Townsend's warbler, Setophaga townsendi
- Hermit warbler, Setophaga occidentalis
- Black-throated green warbler, Setophaga virens
- Fan-tailed warbler, Basileuterus lachrymosus (A)
- Rufous-capped warbler, Basileuterus rufifrons (n)
- Canada warbler, Cardellina canadensis (A)
- Wilson's warbler, Cardellina pusilla
- Red-faced warbler, Cardellina rubrifrons (n)
- Painted redstart, Myioborus pictus (n)
- Slate-throated redstart, Myioborus miniatus (A)

== Cardinals and allies ==
Order: Passeriformes Family: Cardinalidae

The cardinals are a family of robust seed-eating birds with strong bills. They are typically associated with open woodland. The sexes usually have distinct plumages.

- Hepatic tanager, Piranga hepatica (n)
- Summer tanager, Piranga rubra (n)
- Scarlet tanager, Piranga olivacea
- Western tanager, Piranga ludoviciana (n)
- Flame-colored tanager, Piranga bidentata (n) (A)
- Northern cardinal, Cardinalis cardinalis (n)
- Pyrrhuloxia, Cardinalis sinuatus (n)
- Yellow grosbeak, Pheucticus chrysopeplus (A)
- Rose-breasted grosbeak, Pheucticus ludovicianus
- Black-headed grosbeak, Pheucticus melanocephalus (n)
- Blue grosbeak, Passerina (Guiraca) caerulea (n)
- Lazuli bunting, Passerina amoena (n)
- Indigo bunting, Passerina cyanea (n)
- Varied bunting, Passerina versicolor (n)
- Painted bunting, Passerina ciris
- Dickcissel, Spiza americana

== Tanagers and allies ==
Order: Passeriformes Family: Thraupidae

The tanagers are a large group of small to medium-sized passerine birds restricted to the New World, mainly in the tropics. Many species are brightly colored. As a family they are omnivorous, but individual species specialize in eating fruits, seeds, insects, or other types of food. Most have short, rounded wings.

- Blue-black grassquit, Volatinia jacarina (A)

== See also ==
- List of birds of Grand Canyon National Park
