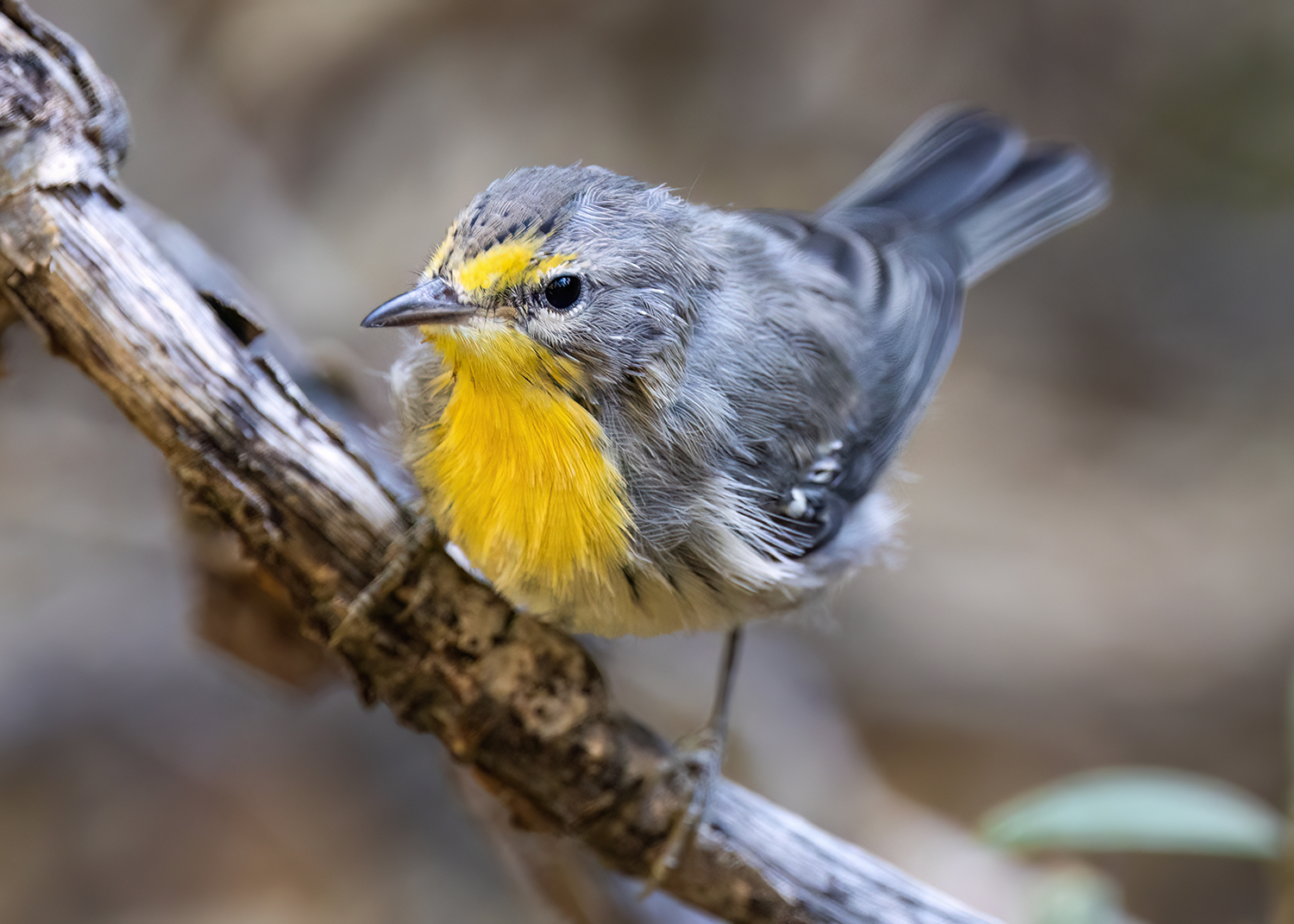

Conservation status
- Least Concern (IUCN 3.1)

Scientific classification
- Kingdom: Animalia
- Phylum: Chordata
- Class: Aves
- Order: Passeriformes
- Family: Parulidae
- Genus: Setophaga
- Species: S. graciae

Binomial name
- Setophaga graciae (Baird, 1865)

Synonyms
- Dendroica graciae Baird, 1865; Dendroica graciae ornata Brodkorb, 1940 (synonym of S. g. remota)

= Grace's warbler =

Species of bird

Grace's warbler (Setophaga graciae) is a small New World warbler that specializes in pine woods.

== Taxonomy ==
Grace's warbler was discovered by Elliott Coues in the Rocky Mountains in 1864. He requested that the new species be named after his 18-year-old sister, Grace Darling Coues, and his request was honored when Spencer Fullerton Baird described the species scientifically in 1865.

== Description ==
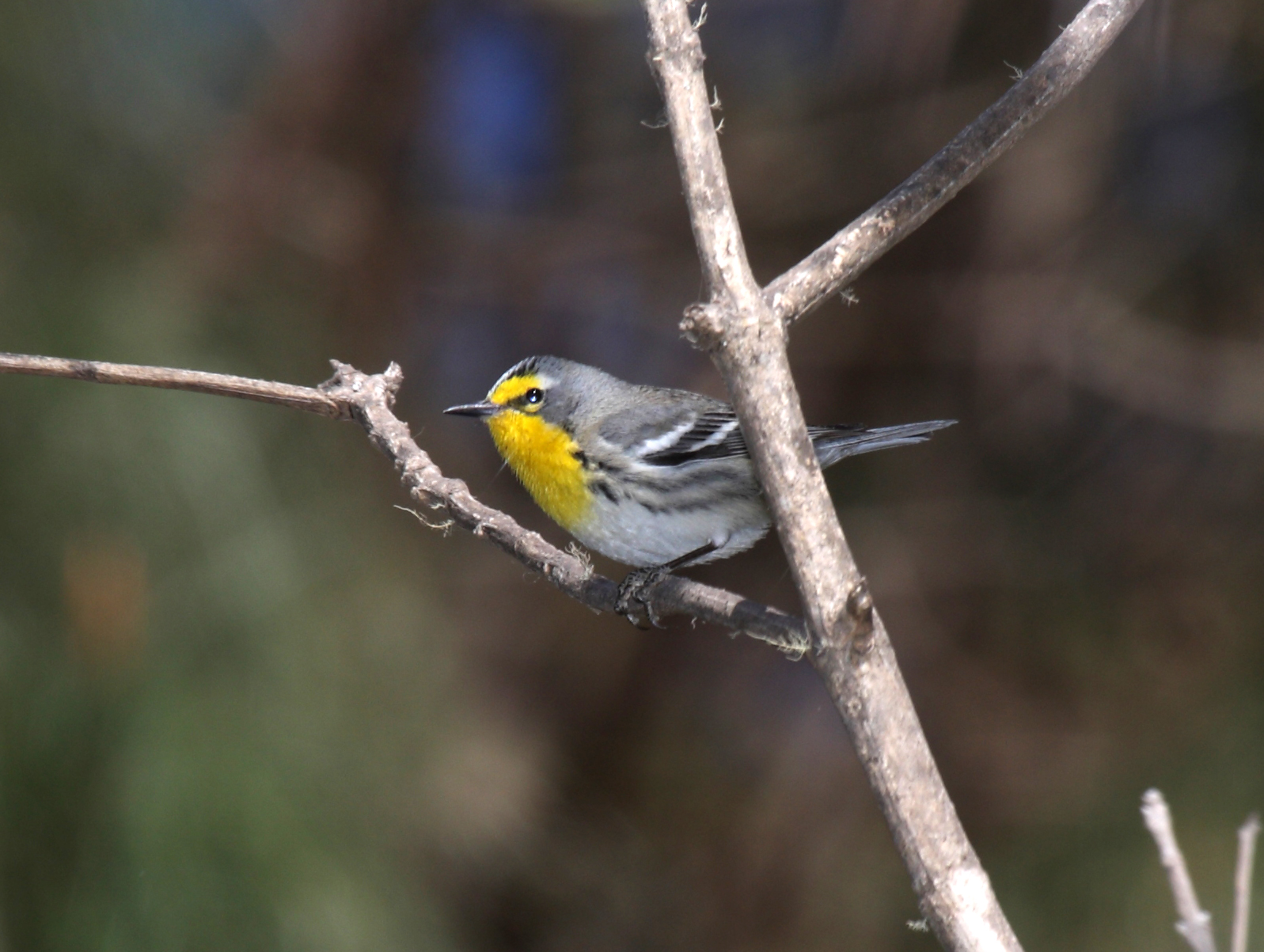
In El Salto, Durango

Grace's warbler is a small bird, 11–13 cm long. It is mostly gray on top, with broken black streaks across the back and flanks and two white bars on the wings. The throat and breast are a vibrant yellow, and the rest of the underparts are white. It has a yellow half-eye ring under the eye and a long yellow "eyebrow" stripe that starts at the base of the beak and runs above the eye, fading to white after it passes the eye.

== Distribution and habitat ==
Grace's warblers breed from the south-western United States to Nicaragua and winter in their breeding range from north-eastern Sinaloa and north-western Durango south. They are almost always found in pine forests, even in migration, though at the northern end of their range (in southern Nevada and Utah and southwestern Colorado) they occur in spruce-fir forest. They prefer open, "parklike" woods, and in some areas such as northern Arizona they prefer an understory of Gambel's oak. In the United States and northern Mexico they typically occur at altitudes of 1,800 to 2,700 meters (5,900 to 8,900 ft)); farther south they may occur as low as 250 m. They are common in some localities, and in areas of the Mosquitia of Nicaragua where the only tree is the Caribbean pine, Grace's warblers may be the only bird seen.

Grace's Warbler is represented by four subspecies, including the nominate.

Setophaga graciae (S. F. Baird, 1865). Southern Nevada, southern Utah, southwestern Colorado, northern New Mexico, and western Texas south through eastern Sonora and western Chihuahua.

Setophaga graciae yaegeri (A. R. Phillips & Webster, 1961). West-central Mexico from southern Sinaloa, Durango, and Zacatecas south to Jalisco and Colima.

Setophaga graciae remota (Griscom, 1935). Pacific coast from Michoacan through Guerrero, Oaxaca, and Chiapas into Guatemala, El Salvador, Honduras, and northern Nicaragua.

Setophaga graciae decora (Ridgway, 1873). Belize.

== Behavior and ecology ==
=== Breeding ===
The nesting habits of Grace's warblers are largely unknown, as nests are very rarely found. The nest is a compact cup of plant fibers, the inside lined with hair and feathers, placed high above ground on a tree branch, usually pine. The female lays 3 to 5 white or cream-colored eggs, speckled with brown, and ringed at the larger end.

=== Feeding ===
Like the vast majority of warblers, Grace's warbler eats only insects and spiders, as far as is known from limited studies. It forages mostly high in pine trees (86% of its foraging time in a study in Arizona was in pines, but it foraged in oaks more in Mexico where olive warblers also occur). It catches its food from the bases of needle clusters and the upper bark of branches no thicker than its body. It will often hover to inspect pine cones for insect larvae. In Arizona it seldom flies to catch insects, but in Nicaragua it often does.
