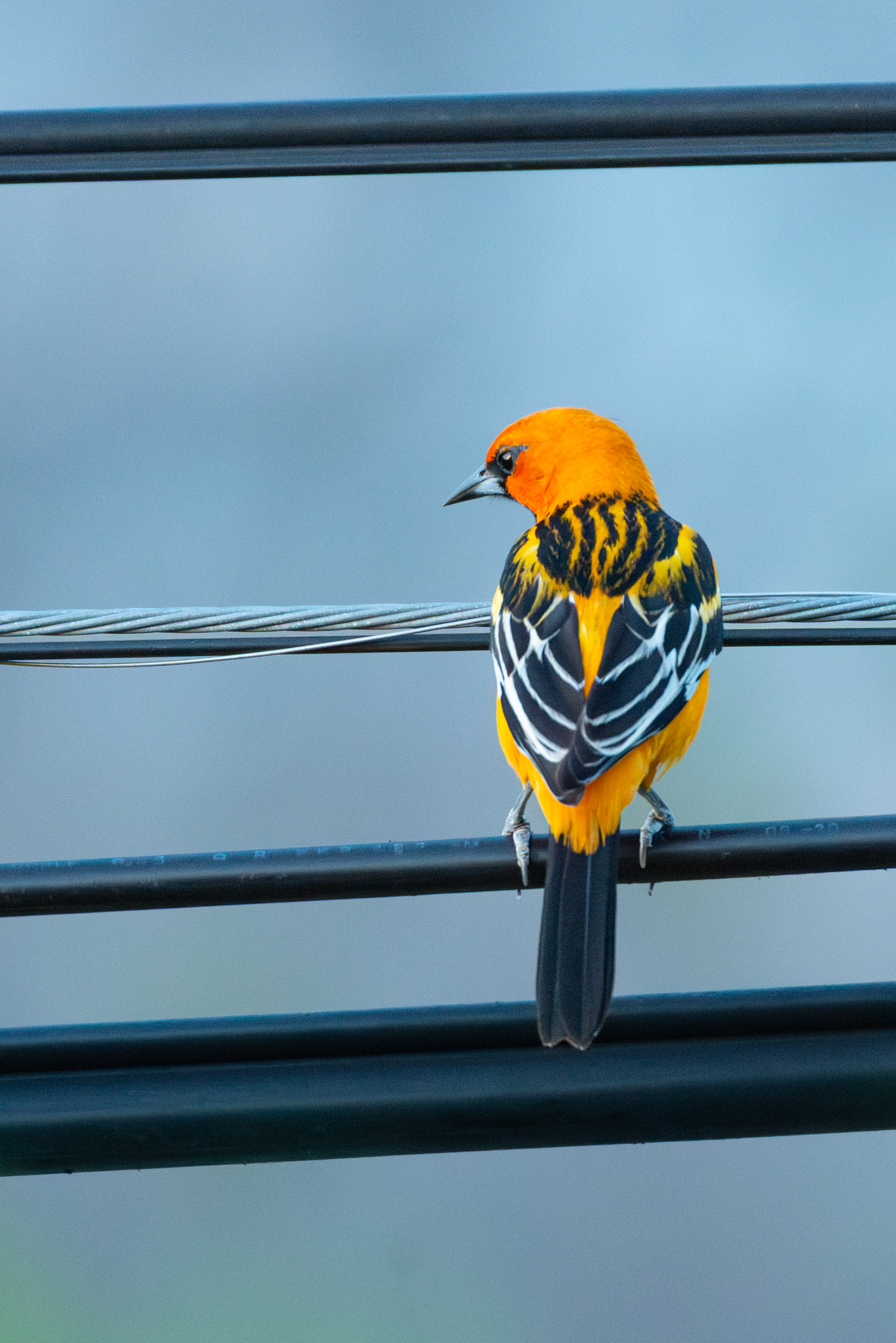
- A streak-backed oriole perched on power lines, showing black and orange streaking on the upper back

Conservation status
- Least Concern (IUCN 3.1)

Scientific classification
- Kingdom: Animalia
- Phylum: Chordata
- Class: Aves
- Order: Passeriformes
- Family: Icteridae
- Genus: Icterus
- Species: I. pustulatus

Binomial name
- Icterus pustulatus (Wagler, 1829)
- Distribution of I. pustulatus

= Streak-backed oriole =

Species of bird

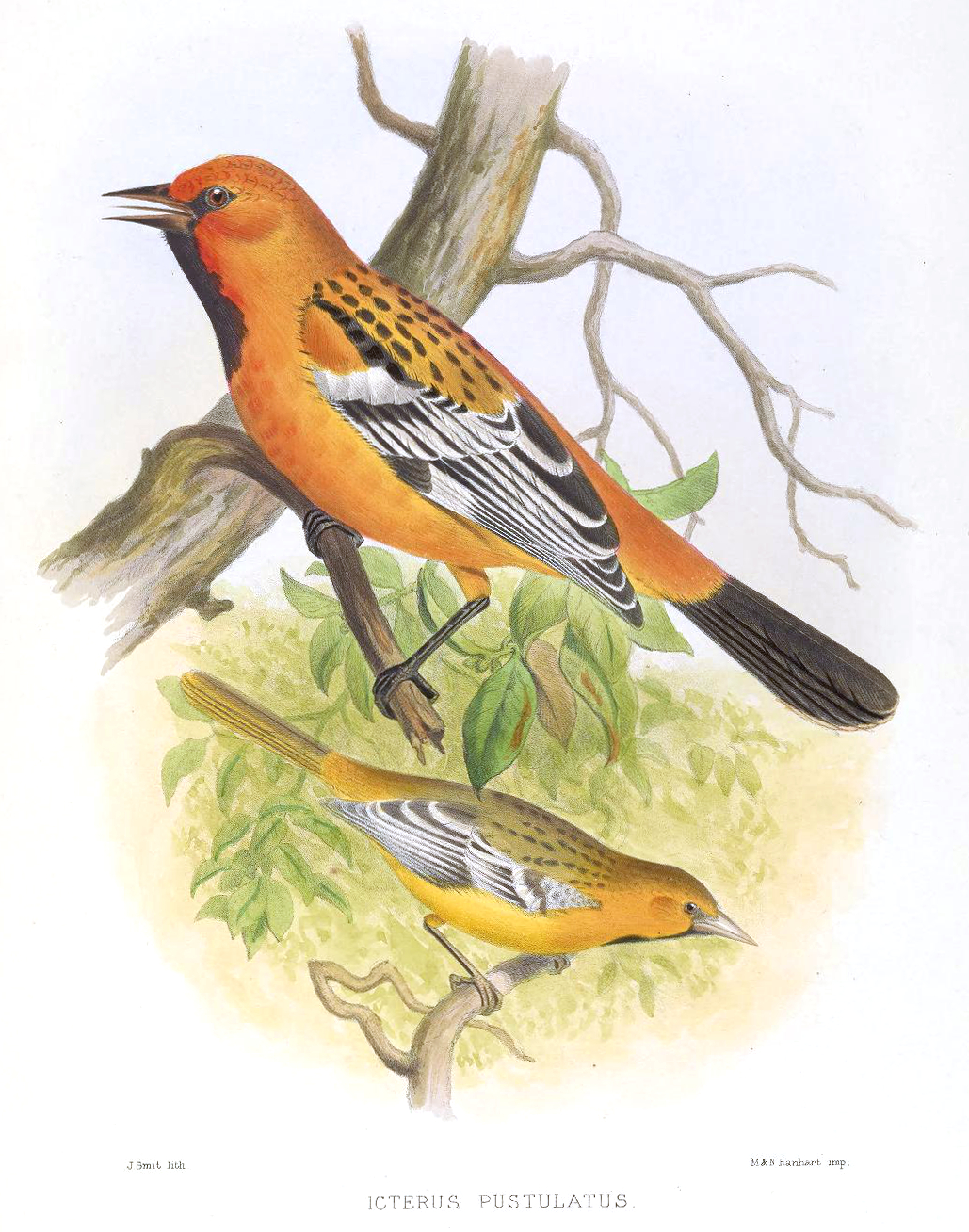
Illustration by Joseph Smit, 1869

The streak-backed oriole (Icterus pustulatus) is a medium-sized species of passerine bird in the family Icteridae, the oropendolas, New World orioles, and New World blackbirds. It is found in Mexico, in Central America from Guatemala to Costa Rica, and occasionally in the United States.

== Taxonomy and systematics ==
The streak-backed oriole was formally described in 1829 with the binomial Psarocolius pustulatus.

The streak-backed oriole's further taxonomy is unsettled. The IOC, AviList, and BirdLife International's Handbook of the Birds of the World (HBW) assign it these eight subspecies:

- I. p. microstictus Griscom, 1934
- I. p. pustulatus (Wagler, 1829)
- I. p. graysonii Cassin, 1867
- I. p. formosus Lawrence, 1872
- I. p. maximus Griscom, 1930
- I. p. alticola Miller, W & Griscom, 1925
- I. p. pustuloides Van Rossem, 1927
- I. p. sclateri Cassin, 1867

However, as of late 2025 the Clements taxonomy does not recognize I. p. maximus and I. p. pustuloides. It instead recognizes I. p. yaegeri (Phillips, 1995) and I. p. dickermani (Phillips, 1995). Both Clements and the American Ornithological Society recognize groups within the species:

- "Streak-backed oriole (West Mexican/pustulatus group)": I. p. microstictus, I. p. pustulatus, and I. p. yaegeri
- "Streak-backed oriole (streak-backed/sclateri group)": I. p. dickermani, I. p. formosus, I. p. alticola, and I. p. sclateri
- "Streak-backed oriole (Tres Marias)": I. p. graysonii

This article follows the eight IOC/AviList/HBW subspecies.

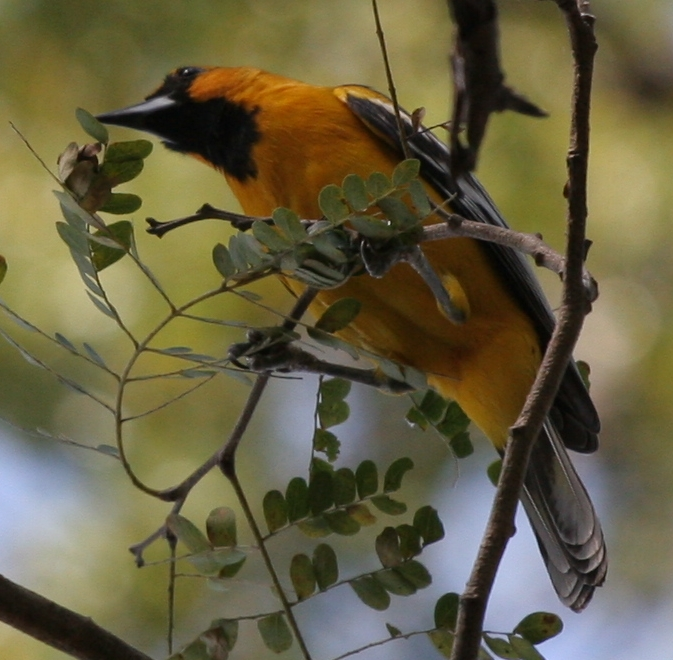
I. p. sclateri in Costa Rica

== Description ==
The streak-backed oriole is 19 to 21 cm (7.5 to 8.3 in) long. Males weigh an average of about 43 g (1.5 oz) and females about 35 g (1.2 oz). Adult males of the nominate subspecies I. p. pustulatus have a deep orange head and breast with black lores, chin, and upper breast. Their upperparts are orange with heavy black streaks on the mantle and back. Their tail is mostly black with white tips on all the feathers and white outer edges on the outermost pair. Their lesser upperwing coverts are orange and the rest of their upperwing is mostly black. Their median coverts have wide white tips that show as large bars on the closed wing and the greater coverts have whitish edges and tips that show as pale panels. The wing's flight feathers also have white edges. Their underparts below the breast are orange to orange-yellow. Adult females have the same pattern as males but are somewhat less richly colored. Both sexes of all subspecies have a dark brown iris, a black bill with a bluish gray inner half of the mandible, and bluish gray legs and feet.

The other subspecies of the streak-backed oriole differ from the nominate and each other thus:

- I. p. microstictus: orange-yellow to fiery orange-red head and breast, smaller black streaks on mantle and back; female sometimes greener than male
- I. p. graysonii: orange-yellow head and fewer black streaks
- I. p. formosus: orange-yellow head and tear-shaped black dots instead of streaks
- I. p. maximus: yellow head and almost solid black mantle and back
- I. p. alticola: orange-yellow head and almost solid black mantle and back
- I. p. pustuloides: deep orange head; streaks like nominate
- I. p. sclateri: orange-yellow head; streaks like nominate

== Distribution and habitat ==
Though some maps show that the streak-backed oriole has a disjunct distribution with a gap between populations in Guatemala, others show a continuous presence through that country. The subspecies are found thus:

- I. p. microstictus: from Chihuahua in northwestern Mexico south to Colima
- I. p. pustulatus southwestern Mexico from Colima to northern Oaxaca, Puebla, and Veracruz
- I. p. graysonii: Tres Marías Island off the coast of Nayarit in west-central Mexico
- I. p. formosus: from Oaxaca and Chiapas in southern Mexico into Guatemala
- I. p. maximus: upper Rio Negro River valley in north-central Guatemala
- I. p. alticola: from Guatemala into northeastern Honduras
- I. p. pustuloides: San Miguel volcano in east-central El Salvador
- I. p. sclateri: from southern El Salvador south through Nicaragua into northwestern Costa Rica

Small numbers of subspecies I. p. microstictus are regularly observed in southern parts of the U. S. states of Arizona and California and the subspecies has nested in Arizona. There are also confirmed records of the species as far north as Oregon and Wisconsin.

The streak-backed oriole inhabits low elevation scrublands, deciduous forest both primary and secondary, gallery forest, savanna, mangroves, and roadsides and villages with trees. Overall it ranges in elevation from sea level to 1,900 m (6,200 ft). South of Mexico overall it ranges up to 1,750 m (5,700 ft). In El Salvador it has a more limited elevational range of 800 to 1,000 m (2,600 to 3,300 ft). In Guatemala and Honduras it reaches 1,550 m (5,100 ft) and in Costa Rica only 500 m (1,600 ft).

== Behavior ==
=== Movement ===
The streak-backed oriole is a year-round resident.

=== Feeding ===
The streak-backed oriole feeds primarily on insects and other invertebrates, fruits, and nectar. It captures prey by gleaning and probing bark, twigs, and leaves. It usually forages in pairs or in small family groups.

=== Breeding ===
The streak-backed oriole mostly breeds between May and July, though somewhat later in the northern part of its range and at higher elevations. It is believed to be mostly monogamous. Its nest is a long bag or pouch woven from plant fibers and fungal rhizomorphs; usually it hangs high in a thorny tree and sometimes from a utility wire. The clutch is three or four eggs that are white to pale blue with dark brown markings. Incubation takes 12 to 14 days and fledging occurs about 14 days after hatch. Both parents provision nestlings. The bronzed cowbird (Molothrus aeneus)is a frequent brood parasite.

=== Vocalization ===
The streak-backed oriole's song is a "pleasant series of sweet, clear whistles (some elements repeated)" and its calls include " a saweet!-taweee!-tawee-tawee, a soft churr'teee, and harsh chatters".

== Status ==
The IUCN has assessed the streak-backed oriole as being of Least Concern. It has a very large range; its estimated population of at least five million mature individuals is believed to be stable. No immediate threats have been identified. It is considered common in northern Central America and uncommon in Costa Rica. "The insular Tres Marías population (graysonii) deserves protection, because of its tiny global range and its distinctiveness."
