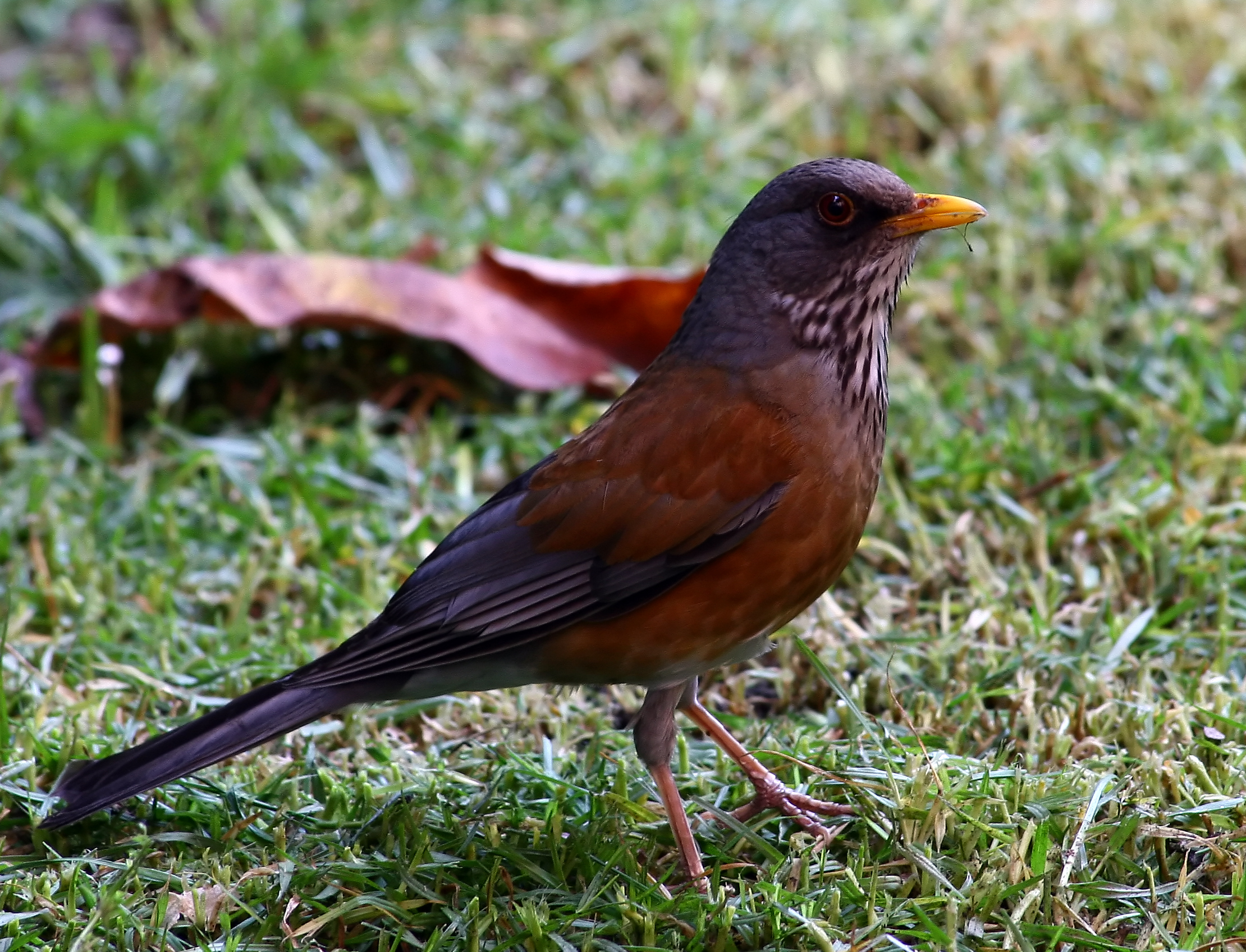

Conservation status
- Least Concern (IUCN 3.1)

Scientific classification
- Kingdom: Animalia
- Phylum: Chordata
- Class: Aves
- Order: Passeriformes
- Family: Turdidae
- Genus: Turdus
- Species: T. rufopalliatus

Binomial name
- Turdus rufopalliatus Lafresnaye, 1840

= Rufous-backed thrush =

Species of bird

The rufous-backed thrush (Turdus rufopalliatus) is a species of bird in the family Turdidae. It is endemic to Mexico but is also a casual visitor to the southwestern United States. It is also known as the rufous-backed robin.

== Taxonomy and systematics ==
The rufous-backed thrush was originally described in 1840 with the binomial Turdus rufo-palliatus and with modern spelling has kept that binomial ever since.

Its further taxonomy is unsettled. The IOC, AviList, and BirdLife International's Handbook of the Birds of the World assign it these three subspecies:

- T. r. rufopalliatus Lafresnaye, 1840
- T. r. interior Phillips, AR, 1991
- T. r. graysoni (Ridgway, 1882)

However, the Clements taxonomy does not recognize T. r. interior but includes it within T. r. rufopalliatus. In addition, some authors have suggested that T. r. graysoni deserves recognition as a full species, "Grayson's robin" or "Grayson's thrush". Clements calls its two subspecies the "rufous-backed robin (rufous-backed)" and "rufous-backed robin (Grayson's)".

This article follows the IOC et al. three-subspecies model.

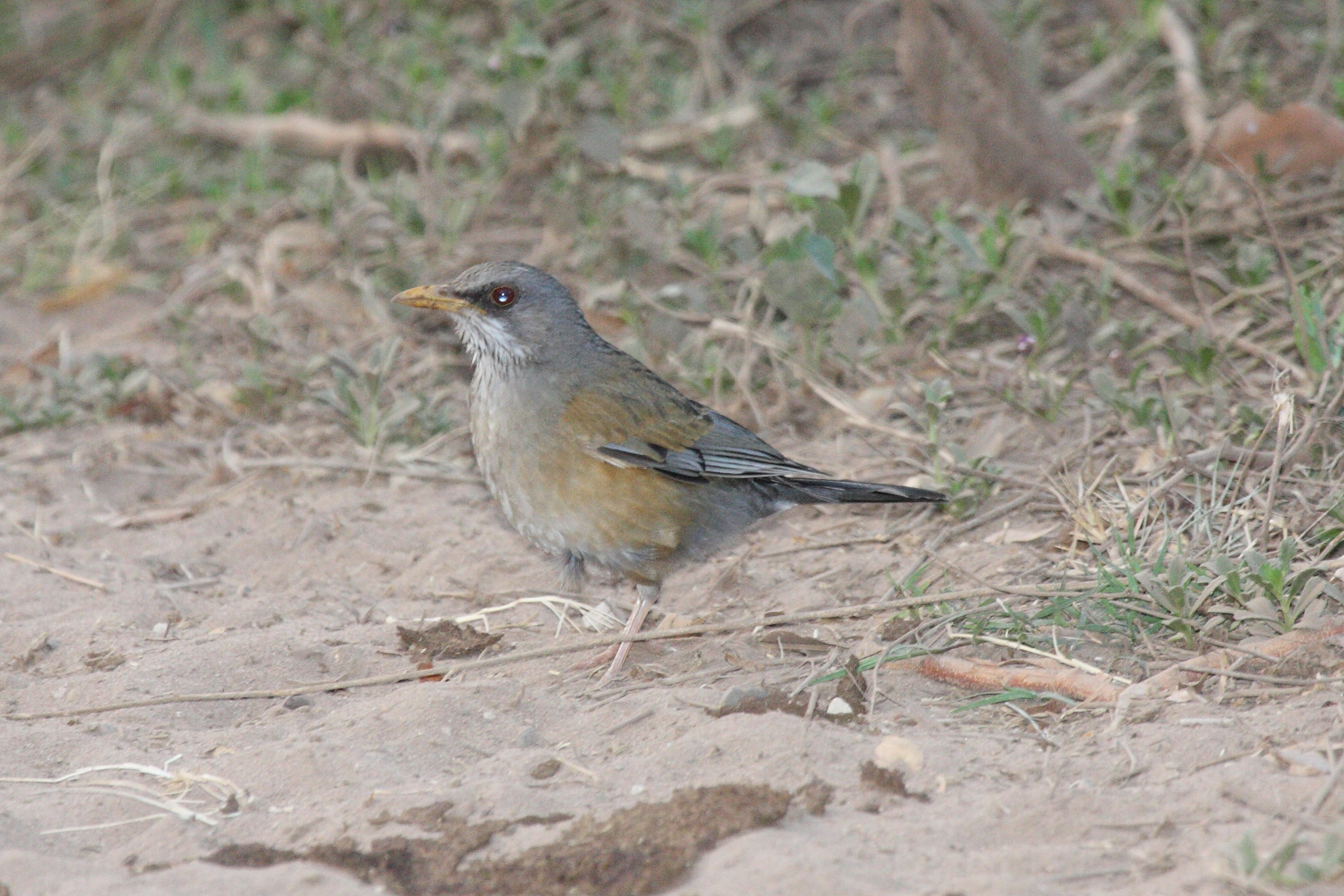
The Islas Marías subspecies T. r. graysoni

== Description ==
The rufous-backed thrush is similar in size and shape to the American robin (T. migratorius). It is 21.5 to 25.5 cm (8.5 to 10 in) long and weighs 72 to 85 g (2.5 to 3.0 oz). It has a wingspan of about 40 cm (16 in). The sexes have similar plumage though females are overall duller than males. Adults of the nominate subspecies T. r. rufopalliatus have a pale gray head with black lores and a yellow eye-ring. Their mantle, wings, and tail are pale gray. Their back and scapulars are dull chestnut with a gray wash. Their throat and the sides of their neck are white with dark streaks. Their breast and flanks are orange-chestnut and their belly and vent are white. They have a yellow bill. Juveniles are similar to adults with the addition of buffy stipples and streaks on their upperparts and dark mottling and barring on their underparts. Subspecies T. r. interior is very like the nominate but with a duller, more maroon, back. T. r. graysoni is larger than the nominate. Its scapulars are grayish buff and its breast and flanks mostly dull buff.

== Distribution and habitat ==
The nominate subspecies of the rufous-backed thrush is found in western Mexico from Sonora south to about Jalisco. It also is an occasional visitor to southeastern California, southern Arizona, south-central New Mexico, and far western Texas. Subspecies T. r. interior is found in south-central Mexico from Jalisco south to western Puebla and Oaxaca. T. r. graysoni is found on the Tres Marías Islands off western Mexico and as a non-breeding visitor to the mainland in Nayarit. There are isolated populations of the species in Mexico City and Oaxaca City that are probably descended from escaped cage birds.

The rufous-backed thrush inhabits a variety of arid to semi-humid landscapes in the tropical and subtropical zones. These include deciduous and semi-deciduous forest, gallery forest, thorn forest, plantations, and gardens. Sources differ on its maximum elevation; one says it is 2,500 m (8,200 ft) and another says 1,500 m (4,900 ft). On the Tres Marias Islands it reaches 600 m (2,000 ft).

== Behavior ==
=== Movement ===
The rufous-backed thrush is non-migratory. However, individuals of the nominate subspecies are fairly regularly found as far north as the southwestern United States, mostly in the non-breeding season between October and April. In addition, some individuals from the Tres Marias population visit the mainland outside the breeding season.

=== Feeding ===
The rufous-backed thrush primarily feeds on fruit, at least in the non-breeding season. It forages on the ground and in trees and bushes. In winter it is often in flocks.

=== Breeding ===
The breeding biology of the rufous-backed thrush in its native range is almost unknown. Its eggs are whitish and heavy with red-brown markings. A study of the species in the urban area Pachuca, Hidalgo, described shallow cup nests made from plant material and mud lined with finer fibers; some human-produced fibers were also used. The nests were in trees at an average of about 6 m (20 ft) above the ground. Clutches averaged 2.75 eggs. The incubation period was about 13 days and fledging occurred about 14 days after hatch. Females alone built the nest and incubated the clutch; both parents provisioned nestlings.

=== Vocalization ===
The rufous-backed thrush's song is "a leisurely rich warbling [that] includes 2-3x repetition of some phrases". Other vocalizations include a "plaintive, mellow, drawn-out whistle, cheeoo or teeeuu, a fairly hard clucking chuk chuk chuk... or chok..., and a high, thin ssi or ssit, mostly in flight".

== Status ==
The IUCN has assessed the rufous-backed thrush as being of Least Concern. It has a very large range; its population of at least 500,000 mature individuals is believed to be stable. No immediate threats have been identified. The mainland subspecies are fairly common to common throughout; T. r. graysoni is common on the islands.
