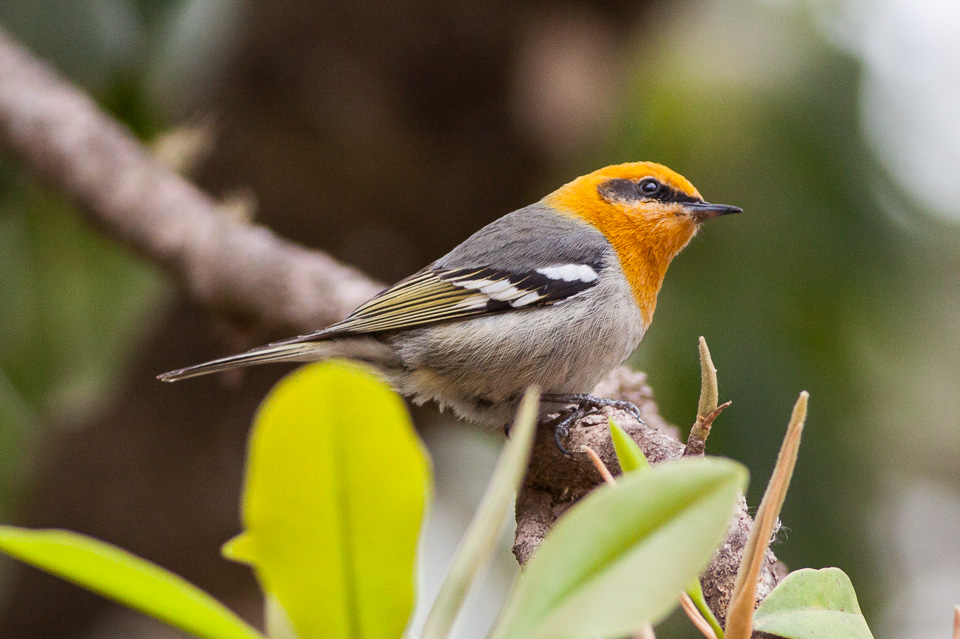

Conservation status
- Least Concern (IUCN 3.1)

- Secure (NatureServe)

Scientific classification
- Kingdom: Animalia
- Phylum: Chordata
- Class: Aves
- Order: Passeriformes
- Parvorder: Passerida
- Family: Peucedramidae; Wolters, 1980
- Genus: Peucedramus; Coues, 1875
- Species: P. taeniatus

Binomial name
- Peucedramus taeniatus (Du Bus de Gisignies, 1847)
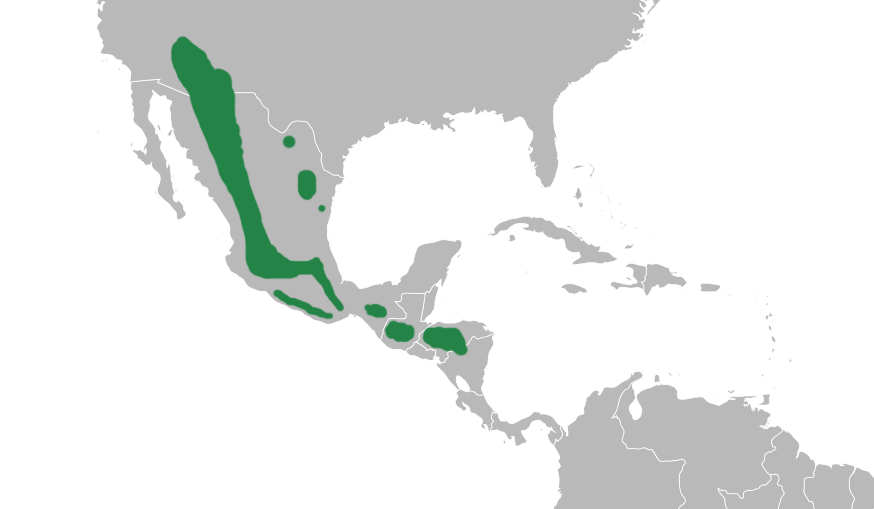

= Olive warbler =

Species of bird

The olive warbler (Peucedramus taeniatus) is a small passerine bird. It is the only member of the genus Peucedramus and the family Peucedramidae.

This species breeds from southern Arizona and New Mexico, USA, south through Mexico to Nicaragua. It is one of the only bird families endemic to North America (including Central America). It was in the past classed with the Parulidae (New World warblers), but DNA studies suggest that it split early from the other related passerines, prior to the differentiation of the entire New World warbler/American sparrow/Icterid group. It is therefore now given a family of its own.

It is an insectivorous species of coniferous forests. Though it is often said to be non-migratory, most New Mexican birds leave the state from November to late February. It lays 3–4 eggs in a tree nest.

== Taxonomy ==
The olive warbler was originally placed in the New World warbler (family Parulidae) genus Dendroica, a group which it closely resembles, particularly in having nine primaries and similar skin. In spite of being assigned to its own genus in 1875, its affinities were a source of contention. The shape of the basihyal bone in the skull, and aspects of its behaviour led to the suggestion that it was instead an Old World warbler in the family Sylviidae. That it was not in the family Parulidae was supported by the arrangement of muscles in the legs. DNA–DNA hybridization placed the olive warbler as an early branch of the finch clade (which included the finches, cardinals and Hawaiian honeycreepers) and the New World sparrow clade (which includes the tanagers, icterids and New World warblers), and a 1998 study of mitochondrial DNA confirmed its status as being far removed from the New World warblers.

The generic name of the olive warbler, Peucedramus, is derived from the Greek peuke for a fir tree and dromos for runner, (from trekho, meaning run), a reference to its feeding habitat and behaviour. The species name, taeniatus, is from the Latin taenia for a headband, and atus for possessing, a reference to its facial markings. The original specific name for the species was olivaceus; however that name was preoccupied and the name was changed.

== Description ==
The olive warbler is a medium-sized warbler, 13 to 14 cm (5.1–5.5 in) in length and weighing 9.5 to 12 g (0.34–0.42 oz). It shows clinal variation in size, with more northern populations being larger than southern ones, a phenomenon known as Bergmann's rule. The olive warbler is a long-winged bird. The plumage of the male is mostly grey body with some olive-green on the wings and two white wing bars. The male's head and breast are "tawny-orange", and there is a black patch through the eye. In the female and juvenile, the orange is replaced by yellow, and the black mask is more diffuse. In addition to differences in size, plumage varies geographically as well, with southern birds having more brightly coloured plumage.

The song consists of clear whistles rendered as hirrJI hirrJI hirrJI, plida plida plida chir chir, etc. The male sings throughout the year, with the frequency of the singing increasing in late winter and reaching a peak in early spring. During the year the male sings the most during the midmorning, but during spring the male sings constantly during mornings and late afternoon. Song is usually delivered from the canopy or other tall trees.

== Distribution and habitat ==
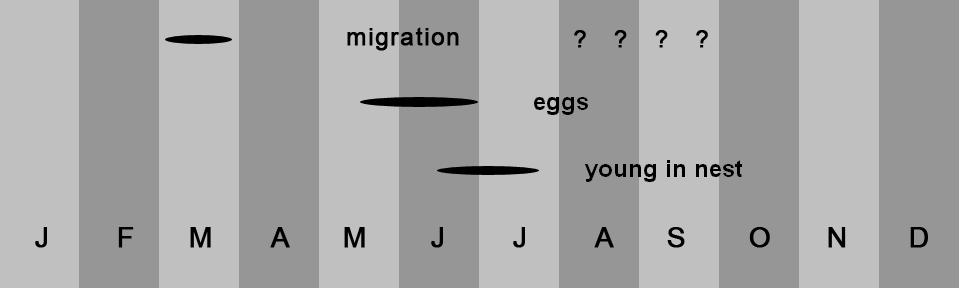
Annual cycle

The olive warbler is distributed from the southwestern United States to Nicaragua, making it the only bird family endemic to North America. In the northern part of its range it has a continuous distribution from Yavapai County, Arizona and the southwestern tip of New Mexico along central Mexico to southern Mexico. It has a disjunct distribution across the rest of its range, with populations in Tamaulipas, Coahuila and Sonora and Chihuahua in Mexico, and further south in southwest Guatemala and from northern El Salvador and central Honduras to northern Nicaragua.

The olive warbler is a bird of mountains and highlands. In northern areas of its range it occurs from 2,600 m (8,500 ft) above sea level or more, in some parts of its range it may not occur below 3,500 m (11,500 ft). In Oaxaca in Mexico it occupies a range of between 1,700–3,000 m (5,600–9,800 ft) further south in Guatemala it ranges down to 1,850 m (6,070 ft) and at the southern end of its range it can be found as low as 1,000 m (3,300 ft) in Honduras and in Nicaragua it occupies a belt of forest from 1,070–1,370 m (3,510–4,490 ft) . They typically inhabit conifer forests, such as ponderosa and sugar pine forests in Arizona, Abies common fir forests, oak, and pine forests in central Mexico, Guatemala, and Honduras. These forests range from humid to semi-arid. In coastal regions stands of palms may be used, and in the Valley of Mexico pine and alder forests are inhabited.

Over most of its range the species is resident, but there is evidence that the most northerly populations are partial migrants. Birds in Arizona, New Mexico, and Mexico apparently move away from their breeding grounds, although what exact movements are made is unclear. It has been suggested that they are either "down slope migrants", moving to lower elevations, or dispersive, as some records show their presence in Texas. Birds attributed to the northern race P. t. arizonae have been recorded near Tepic, in Nayarit. Nevertheless, some birds remain in the northern areas of their range year round.

== Diet and feeding ==
The olive warbler is an insectivore, taking insects and other arthropods. No specific information exists about the actual prey species taken, except that they will take the larvae of Tortricidae moths. It forages in forests in the canopy and subcanopy. In feeds in the outer branches and twigs. It mostly feeds in the branches of ponderosa pines, but also feeds in the branches of grey and silverleaf oaks.
