= Solitary vireo =

Solitary vireo may refer to:

- Cassin's vireo, Vireo cassinii, endemic west of the Rocky Mountains from southwestern Canada to California, United States
- Plumbeous vireo, Vireo plumbeus, endemic east of the Rocky Mountains from southwestern Montana, United States to western Mexico
- Blue-headed vireo, Vireo solitarius proper, endemic to Canada east of the Rocky Mountains to northeastern United States
