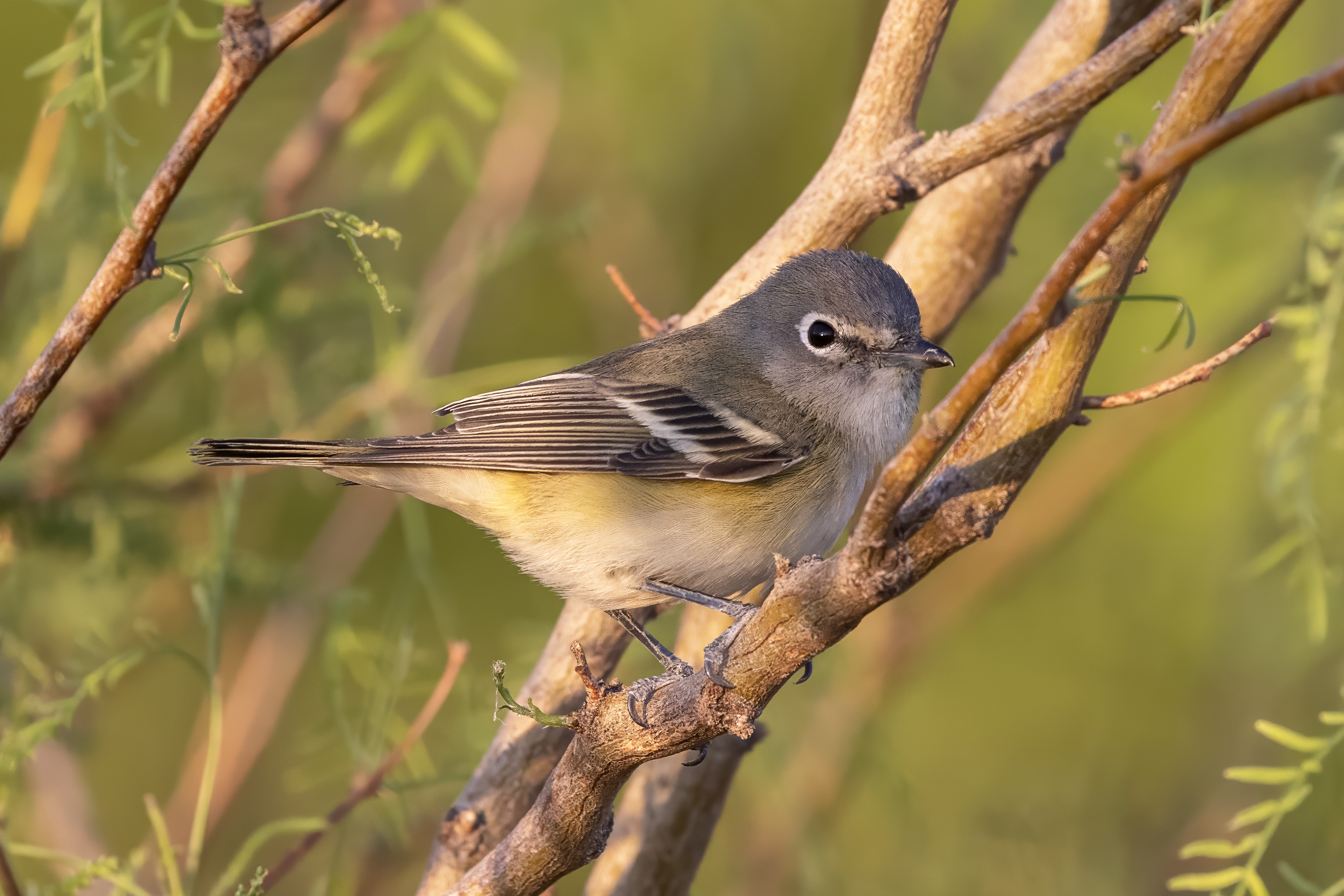

Conservation status
- Least Concern (IUCN 3.1)

Scientific classification
- Kingdom: Animalia
- Phylum: Chordata
- Class: Aves
- Order: Passeriformes
- Family: Vireonidae
- Genus: Vireo
- Species: V. cassinii

Binomial name
- Vireo cassinii Xántus, J, 1858

= Cassin's vireo =

Species of bird

Cassin's vireo (Vireo cassinii) is a small North American songbird, ranging from southern British Columbia in Canada through the western coastal states of the United States, including California, Oregon, and Washington. The Cassin's Vireo moves down Western United States forests in its migration. During its migration in early spring and late fall, it spends the winter in regions from southern Arizona (the Sonoran Desert) to southern Mexico, including parts of Baja California and the Pacific coast of Mexico.

== Appearance ==
The vireo is 11–14 cm (4–6 inches) long. It has a grayish olive head, back, and flanks, with whitish underparts. One of its distinctive features is the solid white "spectacles" around its eyes, along with white wing bars. These markings set it apart from other similar species like the plumbeous vireo and the blue-headed vireo.

== Behavior ==
Cassin's vireo is known for its persistent song, which consists of short, rough-whistled phrases of several notes.These phrases are 2 seconds apart and often alternate between ending on high and low notes, creating a "question-and-answer" pattern. The Cassin's Vireo is known to sing for an extensive duration of time. Hearing a "cha-cha-cha" sound is a common indication of the Cassin's. Other types of birds are usually allured by a Cassin's Vireo's song. The vireo prefers to be in an open woodland in the western mountains and foothills. The open woods are also a preferred breeding location for the Cassin's Vireo. The bird is easily found in the middle to lower areas of the forest canopy, where it knowingly hunts for insects in the foliage.

=== Migration ===
Cassin's Vireo is migratory, typically arriving in April at the breeding grounds and leaving by September. Compared to other Vireos, it tends to arrive a bit earlier in spring and stay later in the fall. Most winter in Mexico, while some fly farther to the north to the southwestern region of the US.

The Cassin's Vireo goes through physiological and behavioral changes in order to prepare for migration. It experiences hyperphagia, a process where birds increase their feeding behavior to build up fat reserves prior to migrating. When the breeding season ends, Cassin's Vireos join the flocks of other woodland birds for more protection before migrating with their young.

=== Nesting ===
Similar to the Blue-headed Vireo, males of this species assert their territory through singing, oftentimes "countersinging" (each bird taking turns singing) to confront other males. Prior to nest-building with a female, males perform courtship displays by ruffling their feathers and revealing potential nest materials. The pair builds a well-crafted cup shaped nest made of bark strips, grass, and other fibers, suspended in the fork of a branch, and often decorated with lichen. Both parents contribute to the incubation of 2 to 5 brown-spotted white eggs for 12–15 days, and after the eggs hatch, they share feeding duties. The helpless hatchlings will then remain in the nest for about two weeks before leaving the nest. Despite challenges like parasitism by Brown-headed Cowbirds, which can reduce the overall nesting success, Cassin's vireo populations have remained stable, even increased in some regions.

== Taxonomy and evolution ==
The Cassin's vireo species was once grouped with the Plumbeous vireo and Blue-headed vireo under the collective name "Solitary vireo" due to their similar appearance and behavior. However, taxonomic revisions split them into three distinct species, with Cassin's Vireo being.the westernmost of the three. It is now placed in the genus Vireo, which includes small, insect-eating songbirds.The species is named after John Cassin, a popular nineteenth-century ornithologist.

=== Subspecies ===
The US Fish and Wildlife Service recognizes the two following subspecies:

- Vireo cassinii cassinii
- Vireo cassinii lucasanus

== Diet and feeding behavior ==
The Cassin's Vireo's diet consists of insects including true bugs, caterpillars, spiders, and ants. In the wintertime and fall, they have also been known to consume fruits and berries so they have enough energy for migration. Trees are the main places in which Cassin's Vireos look for food.

== Conservation and threats ==
The Cassin's Vireo is listed under "least concern" by the IUCN Red List of Endangered Species. It's estimated to have a global breeding population of 5 million.

Deforestation is a mixed threat towards its population. When forests are clearcut, the bird disappears. However, when forests are selectively thinned, its population increases in some cases. Brood parasitism by Brown-headed Cowbirds has been attributed to its recent population decline and rarity in areas like San Diego County. This parasitism is likely a result of environmental changes that have caused the expansion of cowbirds.
