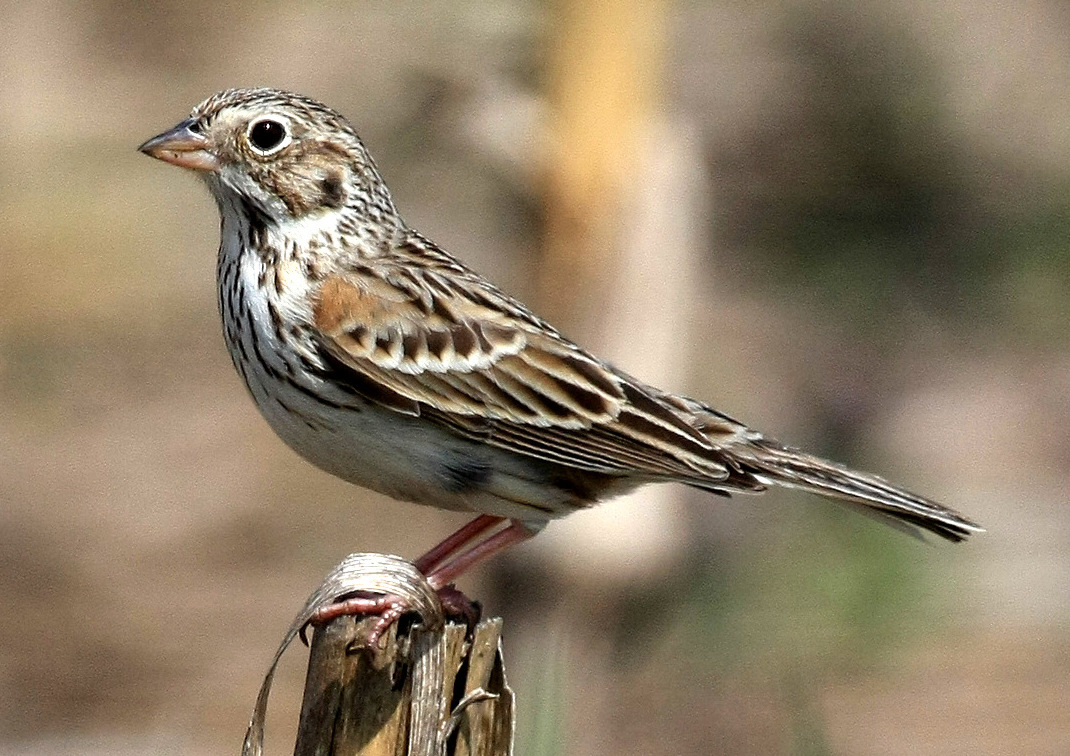

Conservation status
- Least Concern (IUCN 3.1)

Scientific classification
- Kingdom: Animalia
- Phylum: Chordata
- Class: Aves
- Order: Passeriformes
- Family: Passerellidae
- Genus: Pooecetes; Baird, SF, 1858
- Species: P. gramineus

Binomial name
- Pooecetes gramineus (Gmelin, JF, 1789)
- Range Breeding Migration Year-round Nonbreeding

= Vesper sparrow =

Species of bird

The vesper sparrow (Pooecetes gramineus) is a medium-sized New World sparrow. The only member of the genus Pooecetes, it is a pale sparrow with brown streaks that breeds across the grasslands of northern North America. It migrates to winter in the southern United States and Mexico.

== Taxonomy ==
The vesper sparrow was formally described in 1789 by the German naturalist Johann Friedrich Gmelin in his revised and expanded edition of Carl Linnaeus's Systema Naturae. He placed it with the finches in the genus Fringilla and coined the binomial name Fringilla graminea. He gave the locality as New York. Gmelin based his own description on those for the "grass finch" that had been described by John Latham in 1783 and by Thomas Pennant in 1785. The vesper sparrow is now the only species placed in the genus Pooecetes that was introduced in 1858 by the American naturalist Spencer Baird. The genus name combines the Ancient Greek ποα (poa) meaning "grass" with οικητης (oikētēs) meaning "dweller". The specific epithet gramineus is Latin meaning "grassy" or "grass-like".

Three subspecies are recognised.

- P. g. gramineus (Gmelin, JF, 1789) – breeds in southeast Canada to east USA
- P. g. confinis S.F. Baird, 1858 – breeds in southwest Canada and central west USA
- P. g. affinis Miller, GS, 1888 – breeds in northwest USA

== Description ==
The vesper sparrow is 14–16 cm (5.5–6.3 in) in overall length and weighs 19.5–28.3 g (0.69–1.00 oz). Adults have light brown upper-parts and light under-parts, both with darker streaking. There are three features that are unique to the vesper sparrow. The first is the presence of a small, white ring surrounding the eyes. The second is the flash of white tail feathers seen during flight. The third is the presence of a chestnut patch on the shoulder. However, this is usually not visible to an observer.

Another notable characteristic is that some vesper sparrows, especially west of the Cascades, tend to have a more pinkish hue. They also do not have a bold eyeline found in some sparrows.

The male sings from a higher perch, such as a shrub or fencepost, which indicates his ownership of the nesting territory. The musical song begins with two pairs of repeated whistled notes and ends in a series of trills, somewhat similar to that of the song sparrow. They have slurred whistles with one lower pitch followed by a second higher pitch. Furthermore, vesper sparrows make use of short descending trills as a part of their song.

== Distribution and habitat ==
Vesper sparrows are primarily found across Canada and most of the northern United States. Unlike some other sparrows in the regions they are found, vesper sparrows are located in lower elevations of grassy areas such as dry grasslands, sagebrush and fields.

Around September, with the onset of fall, vesper sparrows migrate to the eastern United States, the central United States, Mexico and the Gulf Coast. They return during March as spring arrives to the north.

== Behavior ==
Vesper sparrows tend to be more grounded to the shrub area, often taking dust baths and hopping around. These birds forage on the ground, mainly eating insects and seeds. Outside the nesting season they often feed in small flocks.

=== Breeding ===
The courtship involves the male sparrow running with his wings raised and occasionally jumping around to sing its song. The cup shaped loose nest is placed on the ground. The clutch of 3–5 eggs, usually 4, is incubated by the female for 12–13 days. The chicks are fed by both parents and fledge after at least 9 days in the nest. Two broods are raised per season.

== Threats to population ==
While the species as a whole is not threatened or endangered, it has faced population decline. Between 1970 and 2014, the population decreased by 30% and is currently estimated at around 34 million. The species has a delicate relationship with agricultural land. The loss of farmland due to conversions to more developed regions has created a degree of habitat loss caused by a reduction in space available for nesting. However, farmland habitat also poses potential risks to the species. Improper cultivator operations such as early and frequent harvesting have destroyed nests and eggs. Fallow strips around farmland have also contributed to habitat loss. The reduction in cover can increase exposure to predators.
