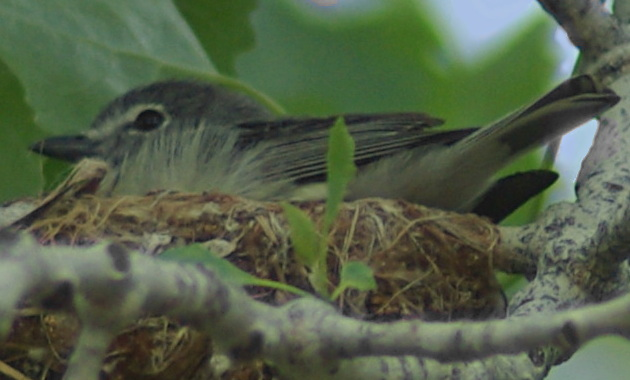

Conservation status
- Least Concern (IUCN 3.1)

Scientific classification
- Kingdom: Animalia
- Phylum: Chordata
- Class: Aves
- Order: Passeriformes
- Family: Vireonidae
- Genus: Vireo
- Species: V. plumbeus

Binomial name
- Vireo plumbeus Coues, 1866
- Breeding Year-round Non-Breeding

= Plumbeous vireo =

Species of bird

The plumbeous vireo (Vireo plumbeus) is a small North American songbird in the family Vireonidae, the vireos, greenlets, and shrike-babblers. It is found from the U. S. states of Montana and South Dakota south to Honduras.

== Taxonomy and systematics ==
The plumbeous vireo was originally described in 1866 as Vireo plumbeous, its present binomial. Until the late 1990s it and what are now Cassin's vireo (V. cassinii) and the blue-headed vireo (V. solitarius) were treated as a single species, the "solitary vireo" (V. solitarius sensu lato). Earlier studies had suggested the split based on morphology, plumage, and vocalizations, and molecular genetic studies published in the early 1990s confirmed differences among the three. They form a superspecies.

The plumbeous vireo has these four subspecies:

- V. p. plumbeus Coues, 1866
- V. p. gravis Phillips, AR, 1991
- V. p. notius Van Tyne, 1933
- V. p. montanus Van Rossem, 1933

Several other subspecies have been named but have not been confirmed as separate from any of these four. There is some doubt about whether V. plumbeous represents one or two species, and the Clements taxonomy separates them within the species as the "plumbeous" (V. p. plumbeus and V. p. gravis) and "Central American" (V. p. notius and V. p. montanus) plumbeous vireos.

== Description ==
The plumbeous vireo is 12.4 to 13.8 cm (4.9 to 5.4 in) long and weighs about 12 to 20 g (0.42 to 0.71 oz). The sexes have the same plumage. Adults of the nominate subspecies V. p. plumbeus have a neutral gray crown and nape, a wide white stripe above the lores, a wide white eye-ring, a dusky stripe through the eye-ring, and neutral gray ear coverts. Their upperparts are neutral gray with an olive-green tinge on the rump. Their wing coverts are blackish gray with whitish tips that show as two wing bars. Their remiges are blackish gray with pale olive gray edges. Their rectrices are blackish gray with wide white edges on the outermost pair. Their underparts are mostly nearly white with smudgy pale grayish olive on the sides of the breast and, in some individuals, very pale sulfur yellow on the flanks.

Subspecies V. p. gravis is larger than the nominate with a darker crown and more olive (less gray) edges on the secondaries. V. p. notius is mostly like the nominate though some individuals have a somewhat greener back and yellower flanks. V. p. montanus has a blue-gray crown, a greenish back, and greenish yellow flanks. All subspecies have a brown iris, a black bill with a grayish base to the mandible, and bluish gray legs and feet.

== Distribution and habitat ==
The plumbeous vireo has a disjunct distribution. The subspecies are found thus:

- V. p. plumbeus: west-central U. S. in southeastern Montana, southwestern South Dakota, and from south-central Idaho, northeastern Utah, and Wyoming south through Nevada, eastern California, Arizona, western Colorado and New Mexico, and extreme western Texas into Mexico as far as Guerrero and south-central Oaxaca
- V. p. gravis: east-central Mexico in Hidalgo, western Veracruz, and Puebla
- V. p. notius: Belize
- V. p. montanus: from southeastern Oaxaca and Chiapas south through central Guatemala and Honduras into northern Nicaragua

The species has also occurred casually or accidentally in Oregon, Louisiana, and a few other locations.

The plumbeous vireo inhabits a variety of landscapes in the temperate and subtropical zones. In the U. S. it primarily is found in coniferous and mixed pine-oak forests including those dominated by ponderosa pine (Pinus ponderosa) and piñon-juniper complexes. It also occurs in riparian woodlands. Further south into Mexico it mostly occurs in pine-oak and oak scrublands. In migration and when overwintering it inhabits a greater variety, adding gallery forest, mangroves, plantations, evergreen forest, and thorn forest. In Belize, Guatemala, and Honduras it inhabits pine-oak forest and pine savanna. In its breeding range it is found at elevations between 1,150 and 2,500 m (3,800 and 8,200 ft) and in Mexico from sea level to 3,000 m (9,800 ft). In Central America it mostly occurs above 600 m (2,000 ft) except in eastern Honduras where it is found at or below 300 m (1,000 ft).

== Behavior ==
=== Movement ===
The nominate subspecies of the plumbeous vireo, which breeds in the U. S. and northern Mexico, is fully migratory. Some of that population migrates through western Arizona; they and the rest overwinter in west-central and southwestern Mexico with a few going further into northern Central America. The other three subspecies are year-round residents.

=== Feeding ===
During the breeding season the plumbeous vireo feeds almost entirely on arthropods. In winter it adds fruits to its diet. It feeds at all levels of its habitat, taking most food by gleaning from leaves and branches. It also gleans food while hovering and by capturing in mid-air. In winter it often joins mixed-species feeding flocks.

=== Breeding ===
The plumbeous vireo breeds between early May and early August in the central U. S.; its season elsewhere is not known. Both sexes build the nest though the male contributes more during the initial phase. The nest is an open cup made from grass, bark strips, plant fibers, animal hair, and human-made material like string, held together and suspended in a branch fork with spider web. It often has lichens, moss, and other items on its exterior. The clutch is usually four eggs though three to five have been found. The eggs are creamy to white with a few brown to black spots. Both sexes incubate the clutch, for about 14 days. Fledging occurs about 13 to 14 days after hatch. Both parents brood and provision nestlings. A significant number of nests are parasitized by brown-headed cowbirds (Molothrus ater) and somewhat smaller numbers by bronzed cowbirds (M. aeneus).

=== Vocalization ===
The male plumbeous vireo's primary song is a "jerky series of burry phrases, separated by pauses [and] often alternates between ascending and descending phrases: ch'reeh ch'roo ch'reeh ch'roo or ch'ree chi-ri'eet ch'ree ch'ree-oo". Another song is a "complicated jumble of chattering, warbling, and singing in rapid and apparently random combinations". The species' calls include an "rasping chatter... cheh-cheh-cheh-cheh-cheh-chee or cha-cha-cha-cha-cha-ree", a loud grating short scolding, and some simple fairly quiet contact calls such as wurp and oodle oodle oodle.

== Status ==
The IUCN has assessed the plumbeous vireo as being of Least Concern. It has an extremely large range; its estimated population of at least 3.5 million mature individuals is believed to be decreasing. No immediate threats have been identified.

== Gallery ==
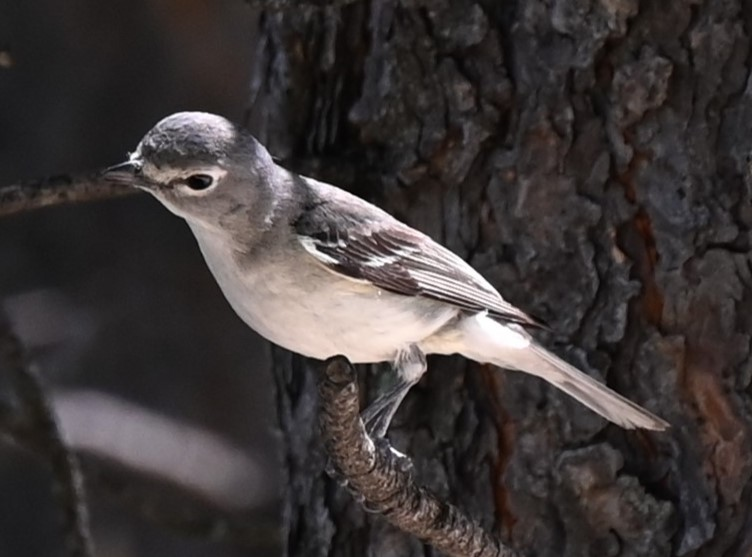
Plumbeous vireo in Custer State Park, South Dakota

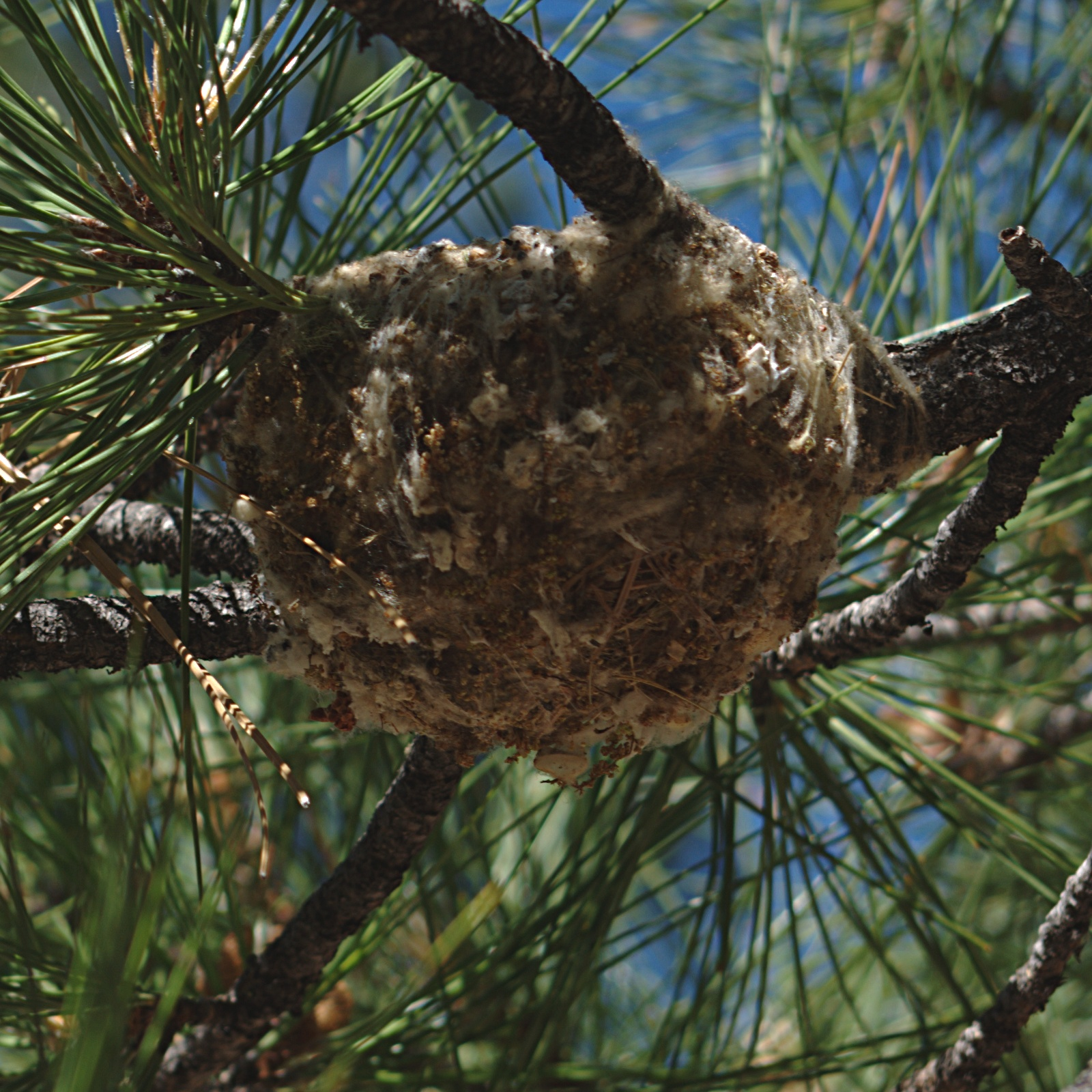
Close-up of nest
