= List of birds of Yosemite National Park =

This is a comprehensive listing of the bird species recorded in Yosemite National Park, which is in the U.S. state of California. This list is based on one published by the National Park Service (NPS) with species confirmed to 2014. The list contains 264 species after taxonomic changes have been made.

This list is presented in the taxonomic sequence of the Check-list of North and Middle American Birds, 7th edition through the 66th Supplement, published by the American Ornithological Society (AOS). Common and scientific names are also those of the Check-list, except that the common names of families are from the Clements taxonomy because the AOS list does not include them.

The following tags have been used to annotate some species. The main body of the NPS list uses a bar chart to depict rare, very rare, and variable species, and appends separate tables for the two classes of "additional species".

- (R) Rare - "present in very small numbers; often highly localized" per the NPS list (16 species)
- (VR) Very rare - "three or fewer occurrences per season; may not be present every year" per the NPS list (31 species)
- (V) Variable - "may be present in a given area one year, rare or absent the next" per the NPS list (3 species)
- (4+) - "Additional species recorded at least four times" per the NPS list (47 species)
- (3-) - "Additional species recorded fewer than four times" per the NPS list (52 species)
- (I) Introduced - a species that has been introduced to North America or directly to California by the actions of humans (6 species)

== Ducks, geese, and waterfowl ==
Order: Anseriformes Family: Anatidae

The family Anatidae includes the ducks and most duck-like waterfowl, such as geese and swans. These birds are adapted to an aquatic existence with webbed feet, bills which are flattened to a greater or lesser extent, and feathers that are excellent at shedding water due to special oils.

- Snow goose, Anser caerulescens (4+)
- Canada goose, Branta canadensis (R)
- Tundra swan, Cygnus columbianus (3-)
- Wood duck, Aix sponsa (4+)
- Blue-winged teal, Spatula discors (4+)
- Cinnamon teal, Spatula cyanoptera (4+)
- Northern shoveler, Spatula clypeata (4+)
- Gadwall, Mareca strepera (3-)
- American wigeon, Mareca americana (4+)
- Mallard, Anas platyrhynchos
- Green-winged teal, Anas crecca (VR)
- Canvasback, Aythya valisineria (4+)
- Ring-necked duck, Aythya collaris (4+)
- Lesser scaup, Aythya affinis (4+)
- Harlequin duck, Histrionicus histrionicus (VR)
- Bufflehead, Bucephala albeola (VR)
- Common goldeneye, Bucephala clangula (4+)
- Barrow's goldeneye, Bucephala islandica (3-)
- Hooded merganser, Lophodytes cucullatus (4+)
- Common merganser, Mergus merganser
- Ruddy duck, Oxyura jamaicensis (4+)

== New World quail ==
Order: Galliformes Family: Odontophoridae

The New World quails are small, plump terrestrial birds only distantly related to the quails of the Old World, but named for their similar appearance and habits.

- Mountain quail, Oreortyx pictus
- California quail, Callipepla californica

== Pheasants, grouse, and allies ==
Order: Galliformes Family: Phasianidae

Phasianidae consists of the pheasants and their allies, including partridges, grouse, turkeys, and Old World quail. These are terrestrial species, variable in size but generally plump with broad relatively short wings. Many species are gamebirds or have been domesticated as a food source for humans.

- Wild turkey, Meleagris gallopavo (I) (R)
- Greater sage-grouse, Centrocercus urophasianus (3-)
- White-tailed ptarmigan, Lagopus leucurus (I) (R)
- Sooty grouse, Dendragapus fuliginosus

== Grebes ==
Order: Podicipediformes Family: Podicipedidae

Grebes are small to medium-large freshwater diving birds. They have lobed toes and are excellent swimmers and divers. However, they have their feet placed far back on the body, making them quite ungainly on land.

- Pied-billed grebe, Podilymbus podiceps (VR)
- Horned grebe, Podiceps auritus (3-)
- Eared grebe, Podiceps nigricollis (VR)
- Western grebe, Aechmorphorus occidentalis (4+)
- Clark's grebe, Aechmorphorus clarkii (3-)

== Pigeons and doves ==
Order: Columbiformes Family: Columbidae

Pigeons and doves are stout-bodied birds with short necks and short slender bills with a fleshy cere.

- Mourning dove, Zenaida macroura
- Band-tailed pigeon, Patagioenas fasciata
- Eurasian collared-dove, Streptopelia decaocto (I) (3-)
- Rock pigeon, Columba livia (I) (4+)

== Cuckoos ==
Order: Cuculiformes Family: Cuculidae

The family Cuculidae includes cuckoos, roadrunners, and anis. These birds are of variable size with slender bodies, long tails, and strong legs. The Old World cuckoos are brood parasites.

- Greater roadrunner, Geococcyx californianus (3-)

== Nightjars and allies ==
Order: Caprimulgiformes Family: Caprimulgidae

Nightjars are medium-sized nocturnal birds that usually nest on the ground. They have long wings, short legs, and very short bills. Most have small feet, of little use for walking, and long pointed wings. Their soft plumage is cryptically colored to resemble bark or leaves.

- Common nighthawk, Chordeiles minor (VR)
- Common poorwill, Phalaenoptilus nuttallii (VR)

== Swifts ==
Order: Apodiformes Family: Apodidae

The swifts are small birds which spend the majority of their lives flying. These birds have very short legs and never settle voluntarily on the ground, perching instead only on vertical surfaces. Many swifts have long swept-back wings which resemble a crescent or boomerang.

- Black swift, Cypseloides niger (VR)
- Vaux's swift, Chaetura vauxi
- White-throated swift, Aeronautes saxatalis

== Hummingbirds ==
Order: Apodiformes Family: Trochilidae

Hummingbirds are small birds capable of hovering in mid-air due to the rapid flapping of their wings. They are the only birds that can fly backwards.

- Black-chinned hummingbird, Archilochus alexandri (4+)
- Anna's hummingbird, Calypte anna
- Calliope hummingbird, Selasphorus calliope
- Rufous hummingbird, Selasphorus rufus
- Allen's hummingbird, Selasphorus sasin (4+)
- Broad-tailed hummingbird, Selasphorus platycercus (3-)

== Cranes ==
Order: Gruiformes Family: Gruidae

Cranes are large, long-legged, long-necked birds. Unlike the similar-looking but unrelated herons, cranes fly with necks outstretched, not pulled back. Most have elaborate and noisy courting displays or "dances".

- Sandhill crane, Antigone canadensis (3-)

== Rails, gallinules, and coots ==
Order: Gruiformes Family: Rallidae

Rallidae is a large family of small to medium-sized birds which includes the rails, crakes, coots, and gallinules. The most typical family members occupy dense vegetation in damp environments near lakes, swamps, or rivers. In general they are shy and secretive birds, making them difficult to observe. Most species have strong legs and long toes which are well adapted to soft uneven surfaces. They tend to have short, rounded wings and to be weak fliers.

- Virginia rail, Rallus limicola (VR)
- Sora, Porzana carolina (4+)
- American coot, Fulica americana (4+)
- Yellow rail, Coturnicops noveboracensis (3-)

== Stilts and avocets ==
Order: Charadriiformes Family: Recurvirostridae

Recurvirostridae is a family of large wading birds which includes the avocets and stilts. The avocets have long legs and long up-curved bills. The stilts have extremely long legs and long, thin, straight bills.

- Black-necked stilt, Himantopus mexicanus (3-)
- American avocet, Recurvirostra americana (3-)

== Plovers and lapwings ==
Order: Charadriiformes Family: Charadriidae

The family Charadriidae includes the plovers, dotterels, and lapwings. They are small to medium-sized birds with compact bodies, short thick necks, and long, usually pointed, wings. They are found in open country worldwide, mostly in habitats near water.

- Killdeer, Charadrius vociferus (R)

== Sandpipers and allies ==
Order: Charadriiformes Family: Scolopacidae

Scolopacidae is a large diverse family of small to medium-sized shorebirds including the sandpipers, curlews, godwits, shanks, tattlers, woodcocks, snipes, dowitchers, and phalaropes. The majority of these species eat small invertebrates picked out of the mud or soil. Different lengths of legs and bills enable multiple species to feed in the same habitat, particularly on the coast, without direct competition for food.

- Least sandpiper, Calidris minutilla (3-)
- Wilson's snipe, Gallinago delicata (R)
- Spotted sandpiper, Actitis macularia
- Solitary sandpiper, Tringa solitaria (3-)
- Willet, Tringa semipalmata (3-)
- Greater yellowlegs, Tringa melanoleuca (3-)
- Wilson's phalarope, Phalaropus tricolor (4+)
- Red-necked phalarope, Phalaropus lobatus (4+)
- Red phalarope, Phalaropus fulicarius (4+)

== Gulls, terns, and skimmers ==
Order: Charadriiformes Family: Laridae

Laridae is a family of medium to large seabirds and includes gulls, terns, kittiwakes, and skimmers. They are typically gray or white, often with black markings on the head or wings. They have stout, longish bills and webbed feet.

- Ring-billed gull, Larus delawarensis (4+)
- California gull, Larus californicus
- Caspian tern, Hydroprogne caspia (4+)

== Loons ==
Order: Gaviiformes Family: Gaviidae

Loons are aquatic birds, the size of a large duck, to which they are unrelated. Their plumage is largely gray or black, and they have spear-shaped bills. Loons swim well and fly adequately, but are almost hopeless on land, because their legs are placed towards the rear of the body.

- Pacific loon, Gavia pacifica (3-)
- Common loon, Gavia immer (4+)

== Cormorants and shags ==
Order: Suliformes Family: Phalacrocoracidae

Cormorants are medium-to-large aquatic birds, usually with mainly dark plumage and areas of colored skin on the face. The bill is long, thin, and sharply hooked. Their feet are four-toed and webbed.

- Double-crested cormorant, Nannopterum auritum (4+)

== Ibises and spoonbills ==
Order: Pelecaniformes Family: Threskiornithidae

The family Threskiornithidae includes the ibises and spoonbills. They have long, broad wings. Their bodies tend to be elongated, the neck more so, with rather long legs. The bill is also long, decurved in the case of the ibises, straight and distinctively flattened in the spoonbills.

- White-faced ibis, Plegadis chihi (3-)

== Pelicans ==
Order: Pelecaniformes Family: Pelecanidae

Pelicans are very large water birds with a distinctive pouch under their beak. Like other birds in the order Pelecaniformes, they have four webbed toes.

- American white pelican, Pelecanus erythrorhynchos (4+)
- Brown pelican, Pelecanus occidentalis (3-)

== Herons, egrets, and bitterns ==
Order: Pelecaniformes Family: Ardeidae

The family Ardeidae contains the herons, egrets, and bitterns. Herons and egrets are medium to large wading birds with long necks and legs. Bitterns tend to be shorter-necked and more secretive. Members of Ardeidae fly with their necks retracted, unlike other long-necked birds such as storks, ibises, and spoonbills.

- American bittern, Botaurus lentiginosus (3-)
- Great blue heron, Ardea herodias
- Great egret, Ardea alba (4+)
- Snowy egret, Egretta thula (4+)
- Green heron, Butorides virescens (3-)
- Black-crowned night-heron, Nycticorax nycticorax (3-)

== New World vultures ==
Order: Cathartiformes Family: Cathartidae

The New World vultures are not closely related to Old World vultures, but superficially resemble them because of convergent evolution. Like the Old World vultures, they are scavengers. However, unlike Old World vultures, which find carcasses by sight, New World vultures have a good sense of smell with which they locate carcasses.

- Turkey vulture, Cathartes aura

== Osprey ==
Order: Accipitriformes Family: Pandionidae

Pandionidae is a monotypic family of fish-eating birds of prey. Its single species possesses a very large and powerful hooked beak, strong legs, strong talons, and keen eyesight.

- Osprey, Pandion haliaetus (VR)

== Hawks, eagles, and kites ==
Order: Accipitriformes Family: Accipitridae

Accipitridae is a family of birds of prey which includes hawks, eagles, kites, harriers, and Old World vultures. These birds have very large powerful hooked beaks for tearing flesh from their prey, strong legs, powerful talons, and keen eyesight.

- White-tailed kite, Elanus leucurus (3-)
- Golden eagle, Aquila chrysaetos (VR)
- Sharp-shinned hawk, Accipiter striatus
- Cooper's hawk, Astur cooperii
- American goshawk, Astur atricapillus
- Northern harrier, Circus hudsonius (R)
- Bald eagle, Haliaeetus leucocephalus (VR)
- Red-shouldered hawk, Buteo lineatus (R)
- Swainson's hawk, Buteo swainsoni (4+)
- Red-tailed hawk, Buteo jamaicensis
- Rough-legged hawk, Buteo lagopus (4+)
- Ferruginous hawk, Buteo regalis (3-)

== Barn-owls ==
Order: Strigiformes Family: Tytonidae

Barn-owls are medium to large owls with large heads and characteristic heart-shaped faces. They have long strong legs with powerful talons.

- Barn owl, Tyto alba (4+)

== Owls ==
Order: Strigiformes Family: Strigidae

Typical owls are small to large solitary nocturnal birds of prey. They have large forward-facing eyes and ears, a hawk-like beak, and a conspicuous circle of feathers around each eye called a facial disk.

- Flammulated owl, Psiloscops flammeolus
- Western screech-owl, Megascops kennicottii
- Great horned owl, Bubo virginianus
- Northern pygmy-owl, Glaucidium gnoma
- Burrowing owl, Athene cunicularia (4+)
- Spotted owl, Strix occidentalis
- Great gray owl, Strix nebulosa (VR)
- Long-eared owl, Asio otus (R)
- Short-eared owl, Asio flammeus (3-)
- Northern saw-whet owl, Aegolius acadicus

== Kingfishers ==
Order: Coraciiformes Family: Alcedinidae

Kingfishers are medium-sized birds with large heads, long pointed bills, short legs, and stubby tails.

- Belted kingfisher, Megaceryle alcyon

== Woodpeckers ==
Order: Piciformes Family: Picidae

Woodpeckers are small to medium-sized birds with chisel-like beaks, short legs, stiff tails, and long tongues used for capturing insects. Some species have feet with two toes pointing forward and two backward, while several species have only three toes. Many woodpeckers have the habit of tapping noisily on tree trunks with their beaks.

- Lewis's woodpecker, Melanerpes lewis (R)
- Acorn woodpecker, Melanerpes formicivorus
- Williamson's sapsucker, Sphyrapicus thyroideus
- Red-naped sapsucker, Sphyrapicus nuchalis (VR)
- Red-breasted sapsucker, Sphyrapicus ruber
- Black-backed woodpecker, Picoides arcticus
- Downy woodpecker, Dryobates pubescens
- Nuttall's woodpecker, Dryobates nuttallii
- Hairy woodpecker, Dryobates villosus
- White-headed woodpecker, Dryobates albolarvatus
- Northern flicker, Colaptes auratus
- Pileated woodpecker, Dryocopus pileatus

== Falcons and caracaras ==
Order: Falconiformes Family: Falconidae

Falconidae is a family of diurnal birds of prey, notably the falcons and caracaras. They differ from hawks, eagles, and kites in that they kill with their beaks instead of their talons.

- American kestrel, Falco sparverius
- Merlin, Falco columbarius (4+)
- Peregrine falcon, Falco peregrinus (VR)
- Prairie falcon, Falco mexicanus (VR)

== Tyrant flycatchers ==
Order: Passeriformes Family: Tyrannidae

Tyrant flycatchers are Passerine birds which occur throughout North and South America. They superficially resemble the Old World flycatchers, but are more robust and have stronger bills. They do not have the sophisticated vocal capabilities of the songbirds. Most, but not all, are rather plain. As the name implies, most are insectivorous.

- Ash-throated flycatcher, Myiarchus cinerascens
- Western kingbird, Tyrannus verticalis (VR)
- Eastern kingbird, Tyrannus tyrannus (3-)
- Olive-sided flycatcher, Contopus cooperi
- Western wood-pewee, Contopus sordidulus
- Willow flycatcher, Empidonax traillii (VR)
- Hammond's flycatcher, Empidonax hammondii
- Gray flycatcher, Empidonax wrightii (4+)
- Dusky flycatcher, Empidonax oberholseri
- Western flycatcher, Empidonax difficilis
- Black phoebe, Sayornis nigricans
- Say's phoebe, Sayornis saya (R)
- Vermilion flycatcher, Pyrocephalus rubinus (3-)

== Vireos, shrike-babblers, and erpornis ==
Order: Passeriformes Family: Vireonidae

The vireos and greenlets are a group of small to medium-sized passerine birds restricted to the New World, though a few members of the family, called shrike-babblers, are found in Asia. They are typically greenish in color and resemble wood-warblers apart from their heavier bills.

- Hutton's vireo, Vireo huttoni
- Cassin's vireo, Vireo cassinii
- Warbling vireo, Vireo gilvus
- Red-eyed vireo, Vireo olivaceus (3-)

== Shrikes ==
Order: Passeriformes Family: Laniidae

Shrikes are passerine birds known for their habit of catching other birds and small animals and impaling the uneaten portions of their bodies on thorns. A shrike's beak is hooked, like that of a typical bird of prey.

- Loggerhead shrike, Lanius ludovicianus (VR)
- Northern shrike, Lanius borealis (3-)

== Crows, jays, and magpies ==
Order: Passeriformes Family: Corvidae

The family Corvidae includes crows, ravens, jays, choughs, magpies, treepies, nutcrackers, and ground jays. Corvids are above average in size among the Passeriformes, and some of the larger species show high levels of intelligence.

- Pinyon jay, Gymnorhinus cyanocephalus (VR)
- Steller's jay, Cyanocitta stelleri
- California scrub-jay, Aphelocoma californica
- Clark's nutcracker, Nucifraga columbiana
- Black-billed magpie, Pica hudsonia (4+)
- Yellow-billed magpie, Pica nuttalli (3-)
- American crow, Corvus brachyrhynchos (VR)
- Common raven, Corvus corax

== Tits, chickadees, and titmice ==
Order: Passeriformes Family: Paridae

The Paridae are mainly small stocky woodland species with short stout bills. Some have crests. They are adaptable birds, with a mixed diet including seeds and insects.

- Mountain chickadee, Poecile gambeli
- Chestnut-backed chickadee, Poecile rufescens
- Oak titmouse, Baeolophus inornatus

== Larks ==
Order: Passeriformes Family: Alaudidae

Larks are small terrestrial birds with often extravagant songs and display flights. Most larks are fairly dull in appearance. Their food is insects and seeds.

- Horned lark, Eremophila alpestris (R)

== Swallows ==
Order: Passeriformes Family: Hirundinidae

The family Hirundinidae is adapted to aerial feeding. They have a slender streamlined body, long pointed wings, and a short bill with a wide gape. The feet are adapted to perching rather than walking, and the front toes are partially joined at the base.

- Bank swallow, Riparia riparia (3-)
- Tree swallow, Tachycineta bicolor
- Violet-green swallow, Tachycineta thalassina
- Northern rough-winged swallow, Stelgidopteryx serripennis
- Barn swallow, Hirundo rustica
- Cliff swallow, Petrochelidon pyrrhonota

== Long-tailed tits ==
Order: Passeriformes Family: Aegithalidae

The long-tailed tits are a family of small passerine birds with medium to long tails. They make woven bag nests in trees. Most eat a mixed diet which includes insects.

- Bushtit, Psaltriparus minimus

== Sylviid warblers, parrotbills, and allies ==
Order: Passeriformes Family: Sylviidae

The family Sylviidae is a group of small insectivorous passerine birds. They mainly occur as breeding species, as the common name implies, in Europe, Asia, and to a lesser extent Africa. Most are of generally undistinguished appearance, but many have distinctive songs.

- Wrentit, Chamaea fasciata

== Kinglets ==
Order: Passeriformes Family: Regulidae

The kinglets are a small family of birds which resemble the titmice. They are very small insectivorous birds, mostly in the genus Regulus. The adults have colored crowns, giving rise to their name.

- Ruby-crowned kinglet, Corthylio calendula
- Golden-crowned kinglet, Regulus satrapa

== Waxwings ==
Order: Passeriformes Family: Bombycillidae

The waxwings are a group of birds with soft silky plumage and unique red tips to some of the wing feathers. In the Bohemian and cedar waxwings, these tips look like sealing wax and give the group its name. These are arboreal birds of northern forests. They live on insects in summer and berries in winter.

- Bohemian waxwing, Bombycilla garrulus (4+)
- Cedar waxwing, Bombycilla cedrorum

== Silky-flycatchers ==
Order: Passeriformes Family: Ptiliogonatidae

The silky-flycatchers are a small family of passerine birds which occur mainly in Central America. They are related to waxwings and most species have small crests.

- Phainopepla, Phainopepla nitens (4+)

== Nuthatches ==
Order: Passeriformes Family: Sittidae

Nuthatches are small woodland birds. They have the unusual ability to climb down trees head first, unlike other birds which can only go upwards. Nuthatches have big heads, short tails, and powerful bills and feet.

- Red-breasted nuthatch, Sitta canadensis
- White-breasted nuthatch, Sitta carolinensis
- Pygmy nuthatch, Sitta pygmaea (R)

== Treecreepers ==
Order: Passeriformes Family: Certhiidae

Treecreepers are small woodland birds, brown above and white below. They have thin pointed down-curved bills, which they use to extricate insects from bark. They have stiff tail feathers, like woodpeckers, which they use to support themselves on vertical trees.

- Brown creeper, Certhia americana

== Gnatcatchers ==
Order: Passeriformes Family: Polioptilidae

These dainty birds resemble Old World warblers in their structure and habits, moving restlessly through the foliage seeking insects. The gnatcatchers are mainly soft bluish gray in color and have the typical insectivore's long sharp bill. Many species have distinctive black head patterns (especially males) and long, regularly cocked, black-and-white tails.

- Blue-gray gnatcatcher, Polioptila caerulea

== Wrens ==
Order: Passeriformes Family: Troglodytidae

Wrens are small and inconspicuous birds, except for their loud songs. They have short wings and thin down-turned bills. Several species often hold their tails upright. All are insectivorous.

- Rock wren, Salpinctes obsoletus
- Canyon wren, Catherpes mexicanus
- Bewick's wren, Thryomanes bewickii
- Northern house wren, Troglodytes aedon
- Pacific wren, Troglodytes pacificus
- Marsh wren, Cistothorus palustris (VR)

== Mockingbirds and thrashers ==
Order: Passeriformes Family: Mimidae

The mimids are a family of passerine birds which includes thrashers, mockingbirds, tremblers, and the New World catbirds. These birds are notable for their vocalization, especially their remarkable ability to mimic a wide variety of birds and other sounds heard outdoors. The species tend towards dull grays and browns in their appearance.

- Gray catbird, Dumetella carolinensis (3-)
- California thrasher, Toxostoma redivivum (VR)
- Sage thrasher, Oreoscoptes montanus (4+)
- Northern mockingbird, Mimus polyglottos (4+)

== Starlings ==
Order: Passeriformes Family: Sturnidae

Starlings are small to medium-sized Old World passerine birds with strong feet. Their flight is strong and direct and most are very gregarious. Their preferred habitat is fairly open country, and they eat insects and fruit. The plumage of several species is dark with a metallic sheen.

- European starling, Sturnus vulgaris (I)

== Dippers ==
Order: Passeriformes Family: Cinclidae

Dippers are a group of perching birds whose habitat includes aquatic environments in the Americas, Europe, and Asia. They are named for their bobbing or dipping movements. These birds have adaptations which allows them to submerge and walk on the bottom to feed on insect larvae.

- American dipper, Cinclus mexicanus

== Thrushes and allies ==
Order: Passeriformes Family: Turdidae

The thrushes are a group of passerine birds that occur mainly but not exclusively in the Old World. They are plump, soft plumaged, small to medium-sized insectivores or sometimes omnivores, often feeding on the ground. Many have attractive songs.

- Western bluebird, Sialia mexicana
- Mountain bluebird, Sialia currucoides
- Townsend's solitaire, Myadestes townsendi
- Swainson's thrush, Catharus ustulatus (VR)
- Hermit thrush, Catharus guttatus
- American robin, Turdus migratorius
- Varied thrush, Ixoreus naevius (R)

== Old World sparrows ==
Order: Passeriformes Family: Passeridae

Old World sparrows are small passerine birds. In general, sparrows tend to be small plump brownish or grayish birds with short tails and short powerful beaks. Sparrows are seed eaters, but they also consume small insects.

- House sparrow, Passer domesticus (I)

== Wagtails and pipits ==
Order: Passeriformes Family: Motacillidae

Motacillidae is a family of small passerine birds with medium to long tails. They include the wagtails, longclaws, and pipits. They are slender ground-feeding insectivores of open country.

- American pipit, Anthus rubescens

== Finches, euphonias, and allies ==
Order: Passeriformes Family: Fringillidae

Finches are seed-eating passerine birds that are small to moderately large and have a strong beak, usually conical and in some species very large. All have twelve tail feathers and nine primaries. These birds have a bouncing flight with alternating bouts of flapping and gliding on closed wings, and most sing well.

- Evening grosbeak, Coccothraustes vespertinus (V)
- Pine grosbeak, Pinicola enucleator (V)
- Gray-crowned rosy-finch, Leucosticte tephrocotis
- House finch, Haemorhous mexicanus
- Purple finch, Haemorhous purpureus
- Cassin's finch, Haemorhous cassinii
- Red crossbill, Loxia curvirostra (V)
- Pine siskin, Spinus pinus
- Lesser goldfinch, Spinus psaltria
- Lawrence's goldfinch, Spinus lawrencei (R)
- American goldfinch, Spinus tristis (VR)

== Longspurs and snow buntings ==
Order: Passeriformes Family: Calcariidae

The Calcariidae are a group of passerine birds that had been traditionally grouped with the New World sparrows, but differ in a number of respects and are usually found in open grassy areas.

- Chestnut-collared longspur, Calcarius ornatus (3-)

== New World sparrows ==
Order: Passeriformes Family: Passerellidae

Until 2017, these species were considered part of the family Emberizidae. Most of the species are known as sparrows, but these birds are not closely related to the Old World sparrows which are in the family Passeridae. Many of these have distinctive head patterns.

- Grasshopper sparrow, Ammodramus savannarum (3-)
- Black-throated sparrow, Amphispiza bilineata (4+)
- Lark sparrow, Chondestes grammacus (VR)
- Chipping sparrow, Spizella passerina
- Clay-colored sparrow, Spizella pallida (3-)
- Black-chinned sparrow, Spizella atrogularis (VR)
- Brewer's sparrow, Spizella breweri (VR)
- Fox sparrow, Passerella iliaca
- Dark-eyed junco, Junco hyemalis
- White-crowned sparrow, Zonotrichia leucophrys
- Golden-crowned sparrow, Zonotrichia atricapilla
- Harris's sparrow, Zonotrichia querula (3-)
- White-throated sparrow, Zonotrichia albicollis (3-)
- Sagebrush sparrow, Artemisiospiza nevadensis (3-)
- Vesper sparrow, Pooecetes gramineus (VR)
- Savannah sparrow, Passerculus sandwichensis (R)
- Song sparrow, Melospiza melodia
- Lincoln's sparrow, Melospiza lincolnii
- California towhee, Melozone crissalis
- Rufous-crowned sparrow, Aimophila ruficeps
- Spotted towhee, Pipilo maculatus
- Green-tailed towhee, Pipilo chlorurus (R)

== Yellow-breasted chat ==
Order: Passeriformes Family: Icteriidae

This species was historically placed in the wood-warblers (Parulidae) but nonetheless most authorities were unsure if it belonged there. It was placed in its own family in 2017.

- Yellow-breasted chat, Icteria virens (4+)

== Troupials and allies ==
Order: Passeriformes Family: Icteridae

The icterids are a group of small to medium-sized, often colorful passerine birds restricted to the New World and include the grackles, New World blackbirds, and New World orioles. Most species have black as a predominant plumage color, often enlivened by yellow, orange, or red.

- Yellow-headed blackbird, Xanthocephalus xanthocephalus (4+)
- Bobolink, Dolichonyx oryzivorus (3-)
- Western meadowlark, Sturnella neglecta (VR)
- Bullock's oriole, Icterus bullockii
- Scott's oriole, Icterus parisorum (3-)
- Red-winged blackbird, Agelaius phoeniceus
- Brown-headed cowbird, Molothrus ater
- Brewer's blackbird, Euphagus cyanocephalus
- Great-tailed grackle, Quiscalus mexicanus (4+)

== New World warblers ==
Order: Passeriformes Family: Parulidae

The wood warblers are a group of small and often colorful passerine birds restricted to the New World. Most are arboreal, but some are more terrestrial. Most members of this family are insectivores.

- Ovenbird, Seiurus aurocapilla (3-)
- Black-and-white warbler, Mniotilta varia (4+)
- Tennessee warbler, Leiothlypis peregrina (3-)
- Orange-crowned warbler, Leiothlypis celata
- Nashville warbler, Leiothlypis ruficapilla
- Virginia's warbler, Leiothlypis virginiae (3-)
- MacGillivray's warbler, Geothlypis tolmiei
- Common yellowthroat, Geothlypis trichas (VR)
- Hooded warbler, Setophaga citrina (3-)
- American redstart, Setophaga ruticilla (4+)
- Cerulean warbler, Setophaga cerulea (3-)
- Northern parula, Setophaga americana (3-)
- Magnolia warbler, Setophaga magnolia (3-)
- Yellow warbler, Setophaga petechia
- Blackpoll warbler, Setophaga striata (3-)
- Palm warbler, Setophaga palmarum (3-)
- Yellow-rumped warbler, Setophaga coronata
- Black-throated gray warbler, Setophaga nigrescens
- Townsend's warbler, Setophaga townsendi
- Hermit warbler, Setophaga occidentalis
- Wilson's warbler, Cardellina pusilla
- Painted redstart, Myioborus pictus (3-)

== Cardinals and allies ==
Order: Passeriformes Family: Cardinalidae

The cardinals are a family of robust seed-eating birds with strong bills. They are typically associated with open woodland. The sexes usually have distinct plumages.

- Western tanager, Piranga ludoviciana
- Rose-breasted grosbeak, Pheucticus ludovicianus (4+)
- Black-headed grosbeak, Pheucticus melanocephalus
- Blue grosbeak, Passerina caerulea (3-)
- Lazuli bunting, Passerina amoena
- Indigo bunting, Passerina cyanea (4+)

== See also ==
- List of birds of California
