= Upper Beaver Meadows =

Meadow in Colorado, United States

Coordinates: 40.368°N 105.631°W

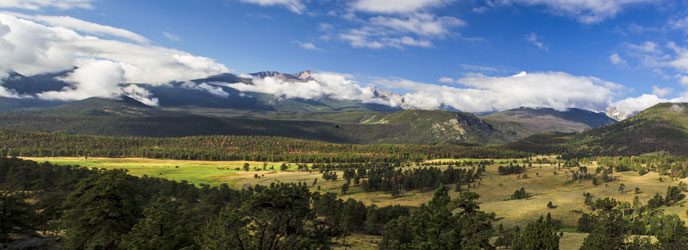
Longs Peak and Upper Beaver Meadows, in the foreground. Courtesy of Rocky Mountain National Park

Upper Beaver Meadows is a montane meadow and visitor attraction in Rocky Mountain National Park in Colorado. The area is known as a good bird-watching spot and its trail leads to a number of other trails within the park. The trails may be used for hiking, snowshoeing, or cross-country skiing.

== Montane ecosystem ==
The meadows of Upper Beaver Meadows rest at the upper limits of the montane ecosystem. Forests of pine and Douglas fir trees only inhabit the slopes of this valley because the soils of the valley bottom are too moist from the high water table to support tree growth. This creates a broad meadow that is kept open by grazing wildlife. The park has fenced in an area where a former aspen grove was mowed down by grazing elk. The aspen grove protected inside the fence has grown dense by sprouting shoots from older trees roots.

Upper Beaver Meadows is described by Scott Roederer as "a pretty little valley of meadows and aspen bordered by ponderosa and spruce / fir forests." Beaver Brook runs through the meadow.

== Recreational activities ==
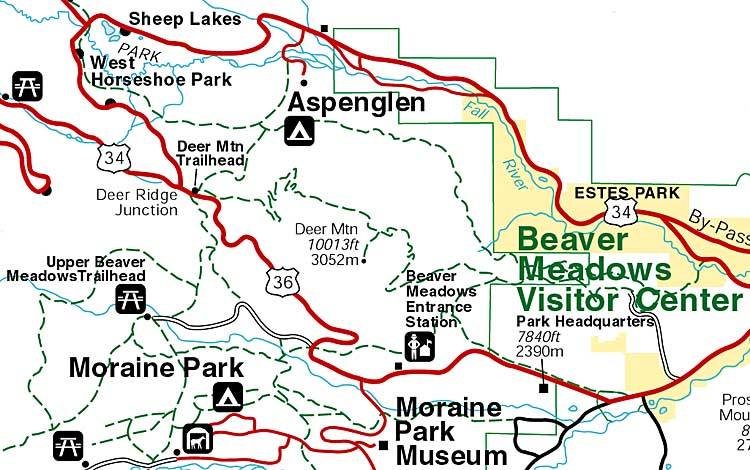
Beaver Meadows map. Courtesy of Rocky Mountain National Park.

Activities include hiking, snowshoeing, and cross-country skiing on Upper Beaver Meadows trail. Upper Beaver Meadows offers two hiking routes. One is on the road which winds along the north side of Beaver Creek for 2 miles (3.2 km). The other is a 1.5 miles (2.4 km) trail that leaves the dirt road, crosses the stream and runs along the south side of the meadow at the base of the moraine. Elk may be seen bedded down among the trees near the trail or along the stream. The trail runs through Upper Beaver Meadows and connects with a number of trails, including Ute Trail, Deer Ridge Trail, Moraine Park, and Windy Gulch.

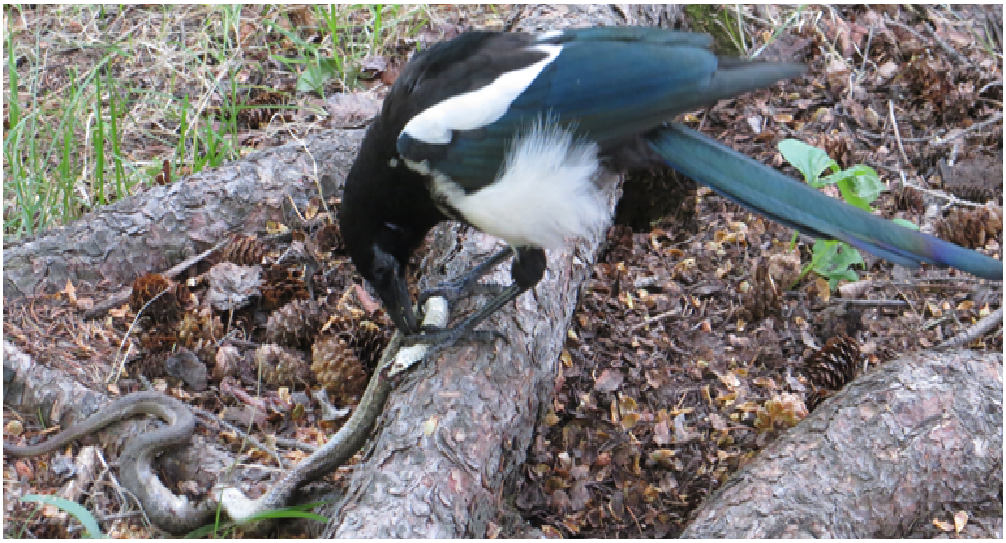
Black-billed magpie eating a wandering garter snake

Birds like three-toed wood peckers and Williamson's sapsuckers may be seen in Upper Beavers Meadows. Others, found in the grassland, are Green-tailed towhees, Vesper sparrows, and Black-billed magpies. Within the aspens, Warbling vireos, House wrens and Mountain bluebirds may be found. There are a number of kinds of sapsuckers, Downy woodpeckers, Hammond's flycatchers, and other birds along the forested land.

== Access ==
The areas is near the Beaver Meadows Visitor Center and off of Bear Lake Road. It is accessed via a dirt road, which is closed most of the winter months. When the dirt road is closed to vehicular traffic, the dirt road may be used by hikers to reach the Upper Beaver Meadows trailhead.
