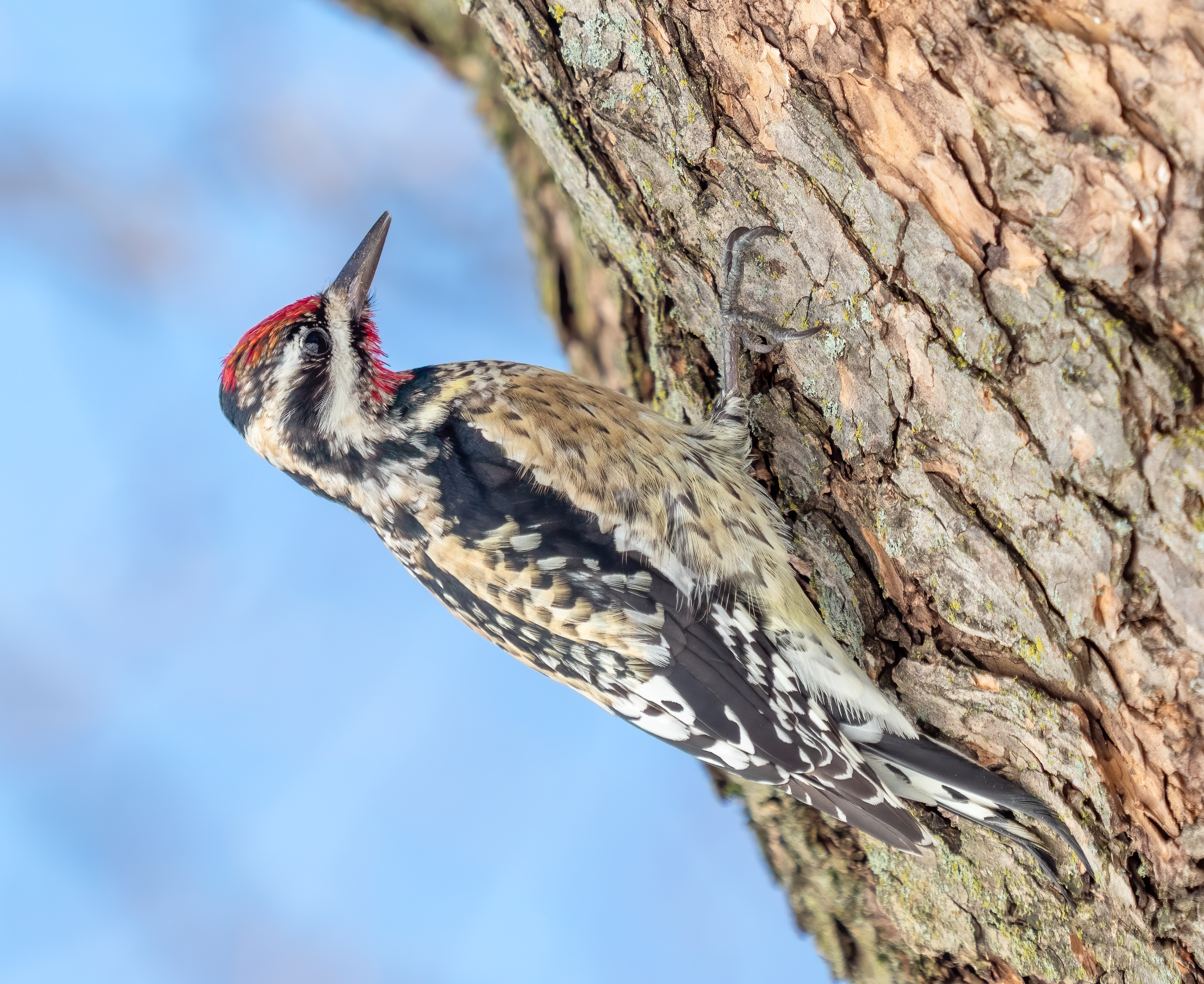
- Male
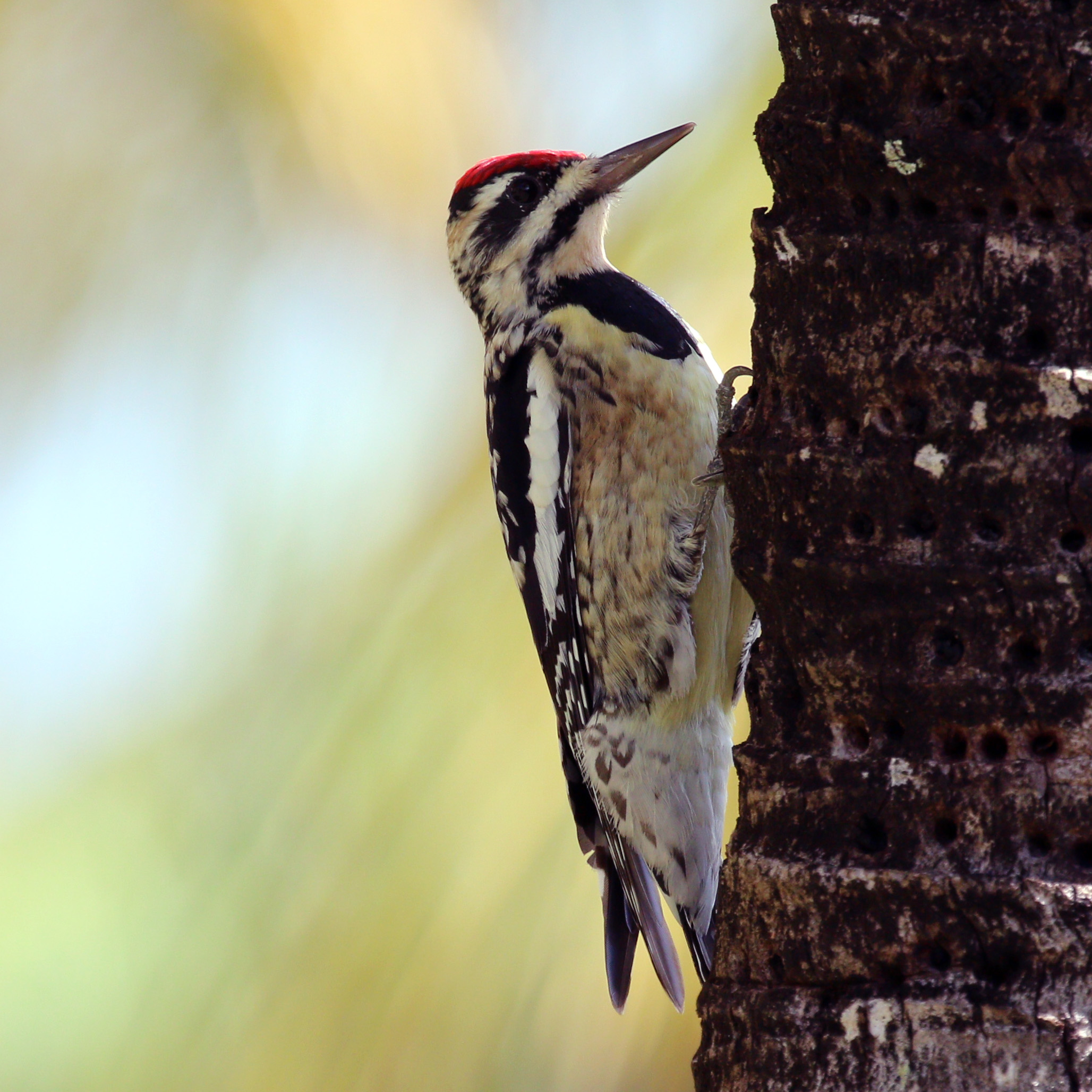
- Female, Cuba

Conservation status
- Least Concern (IUCN 3.1)

Scientific classification
- Kingdom: Animalia
- Phylum: Chordata
- Class: Aves
- Order: Piciformes
- Family: Picidae
- Genus: Sphyrapicus
- Species: S. varius

Binomial name
- Sphyrapicus varius (Linnaeus, 1766)
- Breeding Migration Nonbreeding

Synonyms
- Picus varius Linnaeus, 1766

= Yellow-bellied sapsucker =

Species of North American bird

The yellow-bellied sapsucker (Sphyrapicus varius) is a medium-sized woodpecker that breeds in Canada and the northeastern United States.

== Taxonomy ==
The yellow-bellied sapsucker was described and illustrated using a hand-coloured plate by the English naturalist Mark Catesby in his The Natural History of Carolina, Florida and the Bahama Islands which was published between 1729 and 1732. When in 1766 the Swedish naturalist Carl Linnaeus updated his Systema Naturae for the twelfth edition, he included the yellow-bellied sapsucker, coined the binomial name Picus varius and cited Catesby's book. The specific epithet varius is the Latin word meaning "various," "diverse," or "variegated." Linnaeus specified the type locality as America septentrionalis (North America) but the locality is now restricted to South Carolina. The yellow-bellied sapsucker is now placed in the genus Sphyrapicus that was erected in 1858 by the American naturalist Spencer Baird with the yellow-bellied sapsucker as the type species. Within the genus Sphyrapicus, the yellow-bellied sapsucker is sister to a clade containing the red-breasted sapsucker (Sphyrapicus ruber) and the red-naped sapsucker (Sphyrapicus nuchalis). The species is monotypic: no subspecies are recognised.

- - - Red-breasted sapsucker
    - Red-naped sapsucker
  - Yellow-bellied sapsucker
- Williamson's sapsucker

Cladogram for the relationships between the extant members of Sphyrapicus, based on a 1983 genetic study

== Description ==
The yellow-bellied sapsucker has a length of around 19 to 21 centimetres (7 1/2 to 8 1/4 in), and an average weight of 50.3 grams (1.77 oz), although this can range anywhere from 35 to 62 grams (1.2 to 2.2 oz). The yellow-bellied sapsucker has a wingspan that ranges from 34 to 40 centimetres (13 1/2 to 15 3/4 in). The forehead is coloured bright red in the male (and very occasionally yellow), and a lighter shade of red in the female. Sometimes, this is the only place on the head a female will have red colouration, if it has any at all, as the female rarely has a black head with a few buff spots. The crown is bordered black, and is usually red, and is sometimes mixed with black in the female. There is a white stripe, starting above the eye, that extends and widens to the nape, being broken up by a thin black line on the hindneck. There is a broad black stripe going through the ear-coverts and down to the side of the neck. Below this black stripe is a white stripe that goes from the nasal tufts to the side of the breast. The throat and chin can be used to differentiated between the sexes, as they are white in the female, and red in the male.

The mantle of this sapsucker is white, and there are irregular black bars that extend from it to the rump. The lower rump is white, and the uppertail-coverts are white with some black webbing. The wing coverts are black, and there is a white panel on the medians and central greater-wing coverts. The flight feathers are black with white tips. The innermost tertials are white and black. The underwing is barred greyish and white. The uppertail is black, with some white webbing and white tips sometimes being present on the outer feathers. The underparts, excluding the pale breast and above, are tinged yellow, transitioning to a whiter colour in the lower region of them. The side of the breast down to the undertail coverts have black arrowhead-shaped markings.

The chisel-tipped bill is relatively short and straight, with a slate to blackish colour. The legs are blue-grey to green-grey in colour, and the irides are a deep brown. The juvenile is a dark olive-brown colour overall, with a buff-striped head and a streaked crown. The throat is usually white, although in the male, there may be some red. The upperparts are generally a mottled pale and blackish colour. The breast is scaly, and the central part of the belly is a very pale yellow colour. The tail is barred more than in the adult.

=== Vocalizations and communication ===
Yellow-bellied sapsucker

The yellow-bellied sapsucker, usually the male, utilizes a long distance nasal "neaaah", "owee-owee", "wee-wee-wee-wee", or "kwee-urk" at the start of breeding to attract its mate to various places within its territory. When birds of a family group meet, they exchange low "week week", "wurp wurp", or similar low calls. A scratchy "quirk quirk" is given when pairs meet at the breeding territory. When it is alarmed, this bird will utter a soft mew call, getting louder and hoarser as the threat increases. During a conflict, it produces a shrill "quarr".

This sapsucker drums on materials that reverberate loudly, with drums starting as rapid bursts but becoming more drawn out as time goes on. The bursts usually last between one and a half and five seconds. These drums were previously thought to be used to indicate quality of a nesting or feeding site, but it is likely that they are used as a form of long-distance communication. Trees chosen to drum on are dead, and thus are not those used for feeding or nesting.

=== Similar species ===
The red-naped sapsucker is distinguished by having a red nape (back of the head). The hairy woodpecker has no red on the crown (front of the head) or throat and has blacker back. The downy woodpecker has same markings as the hairy woodpecker but is significantly smaller.

== Distribution and habitat ==
The yellow-bellied sapsucker is found across Canada, eastern Alaska and the northeastern United States. These birds winter in the eastern United States, West Indies and Central America. This species has occurred as a very rare vagrant to Ireland and Great Britain.

When this sapsucker is breeding, it is generally found in deciduous and mixed coniferous forests up to 2,000 metres (6,600 ft) altitude. During the non-breeding season, on the other hand, it usually inhabits forests, but the edge of the forest, open woodland, and semi-open habitats are sometimes utilized. It is also seen at larger trees in pastures, clearings, and suburban areas, in addition to the occasional appearance in palm groves. During this time, the yellow-bellied sapsucker ranges from sea level to elevations of 3,200 metres (10,500 ft), and even 3,400 metres (11,200 ft) in some areas, although the bird normally stays between altitudes of 900 and 3,000 metres (3,000 and 9,800 ft).

== Behavior and ecology ==
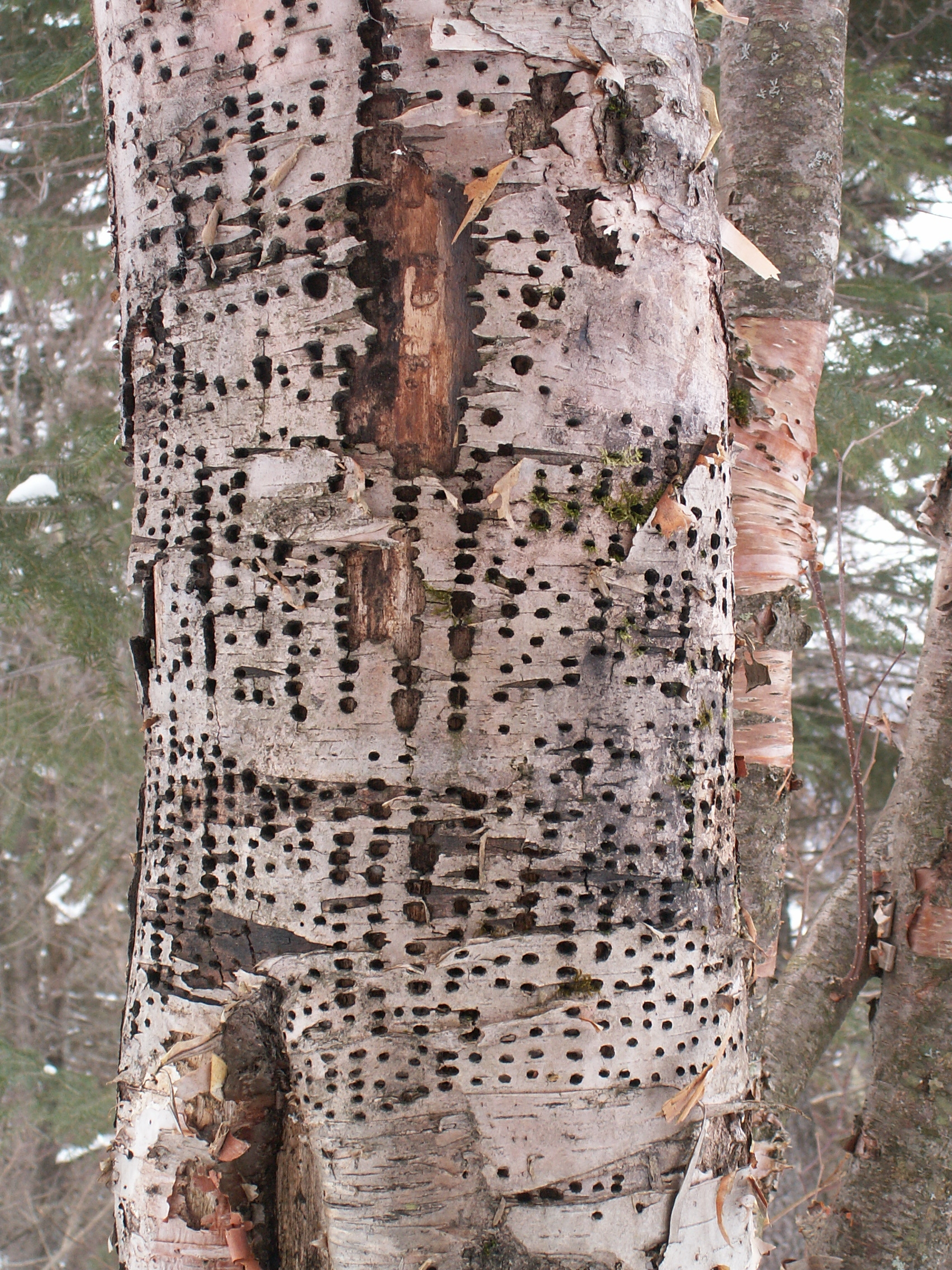
Holes in a dying white birch, Jacques-Cartier National Park

Feeding and defecating

=== Feeding ===
The yellow-bellied sapsucker usually forages by itself, although it sometimes joins small groups in the winter, and occasionally mixes into flocks of insectivores in the winter.

Arthropods, tree sap, fruits, and nuts compose the majority of the yellow-bellied sapsucker's diet. It also takes bast and cambium from trees. Berries are occasionally eaten, and in the Northern Hemisphere spring, buds are eaten. Arthropod prey is usually in the form of Lepidoptera, Odonata, or both the young and adults of beetles and ants. During the nesting season, insects comprise about half the diet of the adults. During the late Northern Hemisphere summer and throughout the same hemisphere's autumn, sap is the primary food of choice. Cambium is taken throughout the year, although it is primarily eaten during the Northern Hemisphere winter and spring. Fruit is mainly eaten during October to February. In their southern Appalachian wintering range, yellow-bellied sapsuckers select a wide variety of trees for sap consumption, with a slight preference for eastern hemlock, shortleaf pine, and several deciduous hardwood species.

The chicks are fed by both sexes. The primary food is insects which are occasionally coated in tree sap before eaten by the chick. The size of these insects varies by the age of the chicks, with younger chicks being fed smaller insects. The chicks beg for food through vocalizations that can be heard 100 metres (330 ft) away or more, likely stimulating the adults to catch more food. These vocalizations are usually done by the hungriest chick, with the other joining in only when the parent is at the nest. Because of this, the hungriest chick gets fed first. When the chick leaves the nest, it relies on both insects from its parents and sap from the holes they drill.

In the breeding season, this sapsucker prefers to take sap from the trees Betula papyrifera, Acer rubrum, Amelanchier, and Populus grandidentata. Other trees of the genera Populus, Betula, and Acer are also used, in addition to deciduous trees of the genera Salix, Carya, Alnus and coniferous trees of the genera Pinus, Picea, and Abies. In the Northern Hemisphere winter and spring, it usually feeds on conifers, while in its autumn, feeding on rough-barked trees is most common.

Before feeding consistently on a tree, this sapsucker lays down exploratory bands near a live branch. These bands are laid down in horizontal rows. When it finds a tree that is photosynthesizing, then it lays down more holes to feed, about 0.5 centimetres (0.20 in) above the primary bands. These form columns. Each hole is started as an oval elongated horizontally, drilled through the bark and phloem layers to the outside of the xylem. They are then drilled further, with the sapsucker enlarging it vertically, making it yield more sap, but only for a few days. The top holes in each column thus provides phloem sap, and this sapsucker also utilizes the bast from the edges of the holes drilled. In the winter, when the holes are drilled on conifers, bast is likely the most important food.

=== Breeding ===
Yellow-bellied sapsuckers nest in a large cavity excavated in a live deciduous tree, often choosing one that has rotten heartwood; a suitable tree may be reused. It especially prefers Populus tremuloides trees that have conks of Fomes fomentarius var. populinus. Other trees in the genus Populus and those in the genus Betula are popular choices. A study in northern Canada found that the yellow-bellied sapsucker nested in trees with a diameter at breast height (DBH) ranging anywhere from 22 to 79 centimetres (8.7 to 31.1 in), with an average DBH of about 35 centimetres (14 in) for nestling trees, compared to the average DBH in the area of about 41 centimetres (16 in). A study in the northeastern United States, however, concluded that this sapsucker has a search image for trees with the ideal attributes; one of these attributes was having a DBH of 20 to 25 centimetres (7.9 to 9.8 in). The study also concluded that a deviance from this search image can be caused by the rarity of the trees that fulfill such criteria.

This bird is monogamous, and nests in pairs, with both sexes working to make the nest. Excavation of the cavity is done mostly by the male, with excavation usually being done continuously for 15 to 30 minutes at a time. Excavation takes about 15 to 28 days, although further hollowing out is done by both sexes after the chicks hatch. The cavity itself is anywhere from 2 to 20 metres (6.6 to 65.6 ft) above ground, although it is usually found between heights of 3 and 14 metres (9.8 and 45.9 ft). This sapsucker is also territorial, with territories having a radius ranging from about 46 to 137 metres (150 to 450 ft) away from the nest. Territories in less wooded areas are often larger than those in areas heavily wooded.

The male usually arrives on the nesting grounds about one week before the female. The sapsucker arrives early in the Northern Hemisphere spring, often before heavy snowfall has stopped. The actual breeding season is from April to July.

During nest excavation, a bird may perform a courtship flight. This flight consists of the sapsucker rapidly flapping its wings below its partner. It seems to build the pair bond and help increase attachment to the nest. Members of a pair also perform a dance where they bob their heads and repeatedly opening their wings halfway. They also have the courtship ritual of touching their bills together. Courtship additionally consists of giving "quirk" notes and, from a distance, "kwee-urk" calls. Copulation can consist of the female perching perpendicularly on a branch, the male mounting her back, gradually falling backwards and to the left, until he is upside down and at a right angle to the female.

This bird lays a clutch of four to seven eggs, with clutches being larger for birds in the northern part of the range. The eggs themselves are white and spotless, measuring around 24 by 17 millimetres (0.94 by 0.67 in). During egg laying, the female is dominant, sometimes driving the male away from the nest. Both sexes incubate the eggs during the 10 to 13 day incubation period, with the male usually doing so over the night. Sapsuckers are restless but quiet during this time, and the eggs are left uncovered about 16% of the time during the incubation period. Weather usually does not affect incubation, although on particularly hot days, the parents incubate the eggs for less time. When the chicks hatch, they are brooded for 8 to 10 days by both sexes. Nests with fewer young are brooded more, presumably because smaller broods lose heat faster. After 25 to 29 days, the young leave the nest for this first time, and become independent after about two weeks.

== Predators and parasites ==
The yellow-bellied sapsucker is parasitized by Haemoproteus velans, a sporozoan parasite that is transmitted to this bird through biting midges of the genus Culicoides. It is also host to Philopterus californiens, a philopterid louse.

Adults and nestlings can be killed by raccoons, especially if the nest is either too low or not deep enough. Sapsuckers are also especially susceptible to raccoon attacks when nesting in trees other than P. tremuloides infected by F. fomentarius. This is theorized to contribute to the evolution of a search image for ideal nesting trees. Other nest predators include snakes.

== Relationship with humans ==
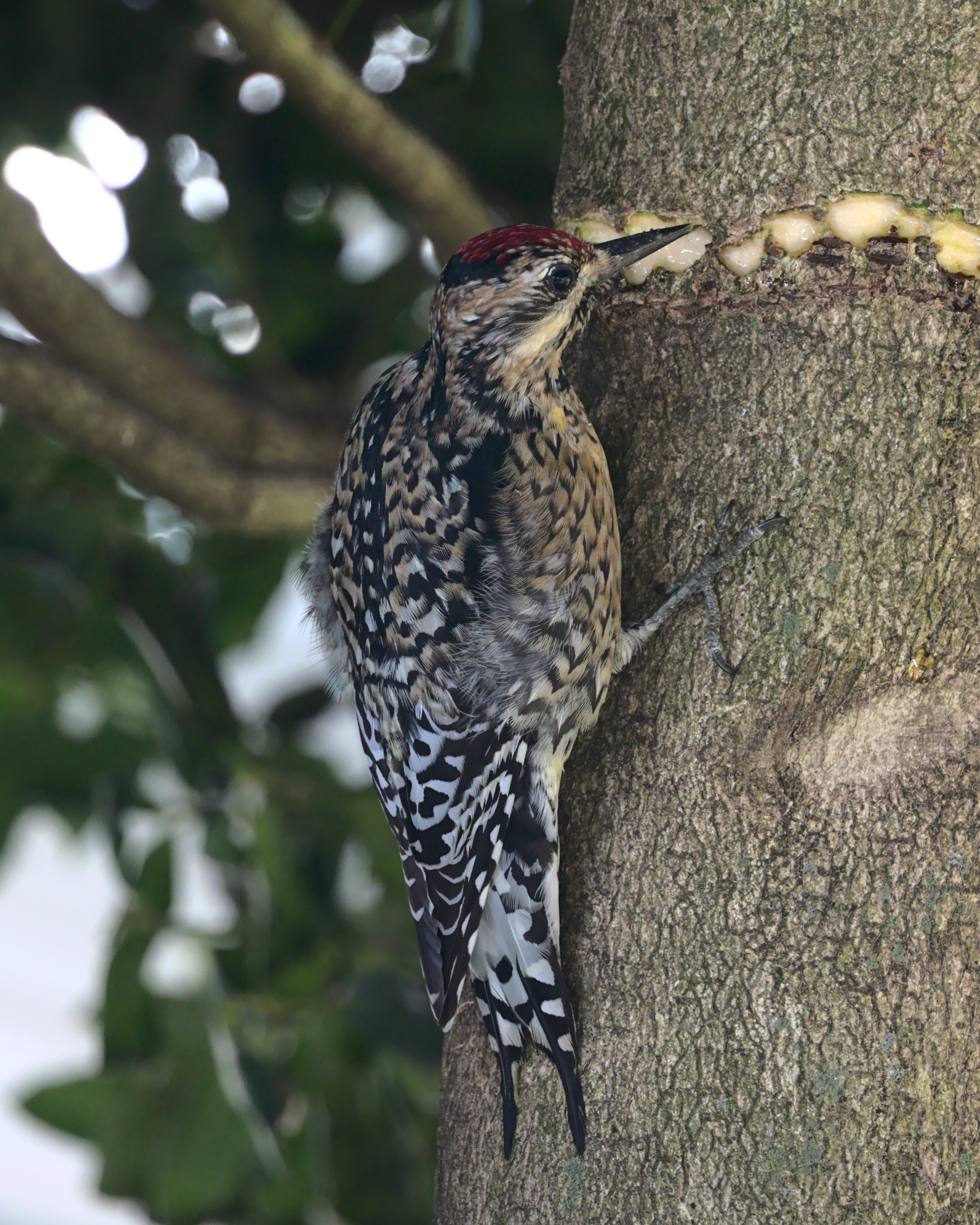
Yellow-bellied sapsucker girdling a holly tree

=== Damage to trees ===
Because the feeding habits of the yellow-bellied sapsucker can injure trees and attract insects, it is sometimes considered a pest. The birds can cause serious damage to trees, and intensive feeding has been documented as a source of tree mortality. Sapsucker feeding can kill a tree by girdling, which occurs when a ring of bark around the trunk is severely injured. Ring shake—spaces between rings of growth in trees—can be a result of sapsucker injury. Certain tree species are particularly susceptible to dying after being damaged by yellow-bellied sapsuckers. For example, a USDA forest study that examined trees injured by yellow-bellied sapsuckers noted a mortality of 67% for Betula populifolia, 51% for B. papyrifera, and 40% for Acer rubrum. In other tree species, injuries inflicted by yellow-bellied sapsuckers can result in significantly less mortality. The USDA study noted that only 3% of Picea rubens and 1% of Tsuga canadensis that were injured by sapsuckers succumbed to their wounds.

== Status and conservation ==
The yellow-bellied sapsucker is considered to be least concern by the IUCN, even though it has a decreasing population. This is because of its large range of about 7,830,000 square kilometres (3,020,000 mi^{2}). In addition, it has a large population, being common in its range, although it is not easily seen when not breeding. It has low genetic diversity; about half that of most birds.

In the United States, yellow-bellied sapsuckers are listed and protected under the Migratory Bird Treaty Act, making taking, killing, or possessing one illegal without a permit.

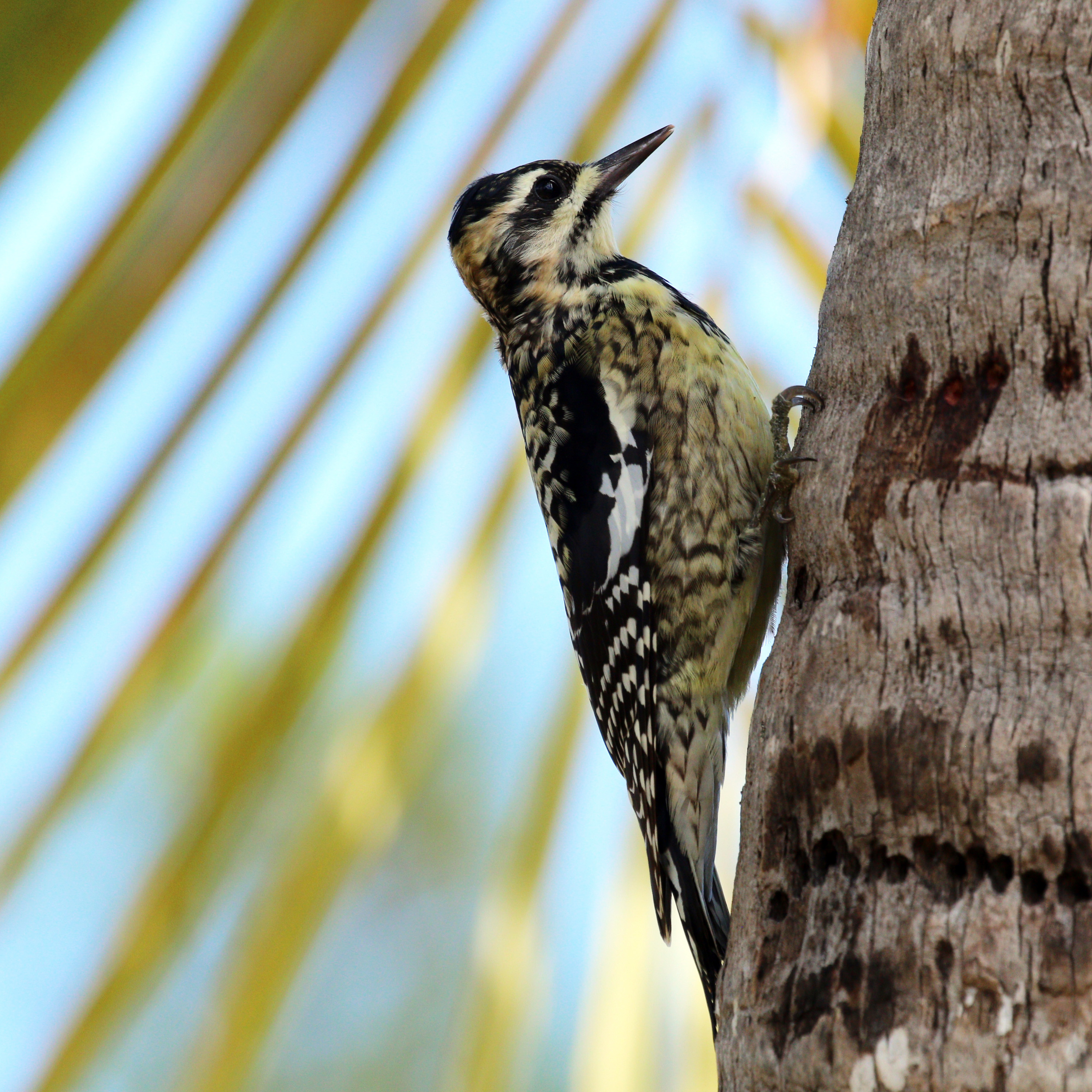
juvenile, Cuba

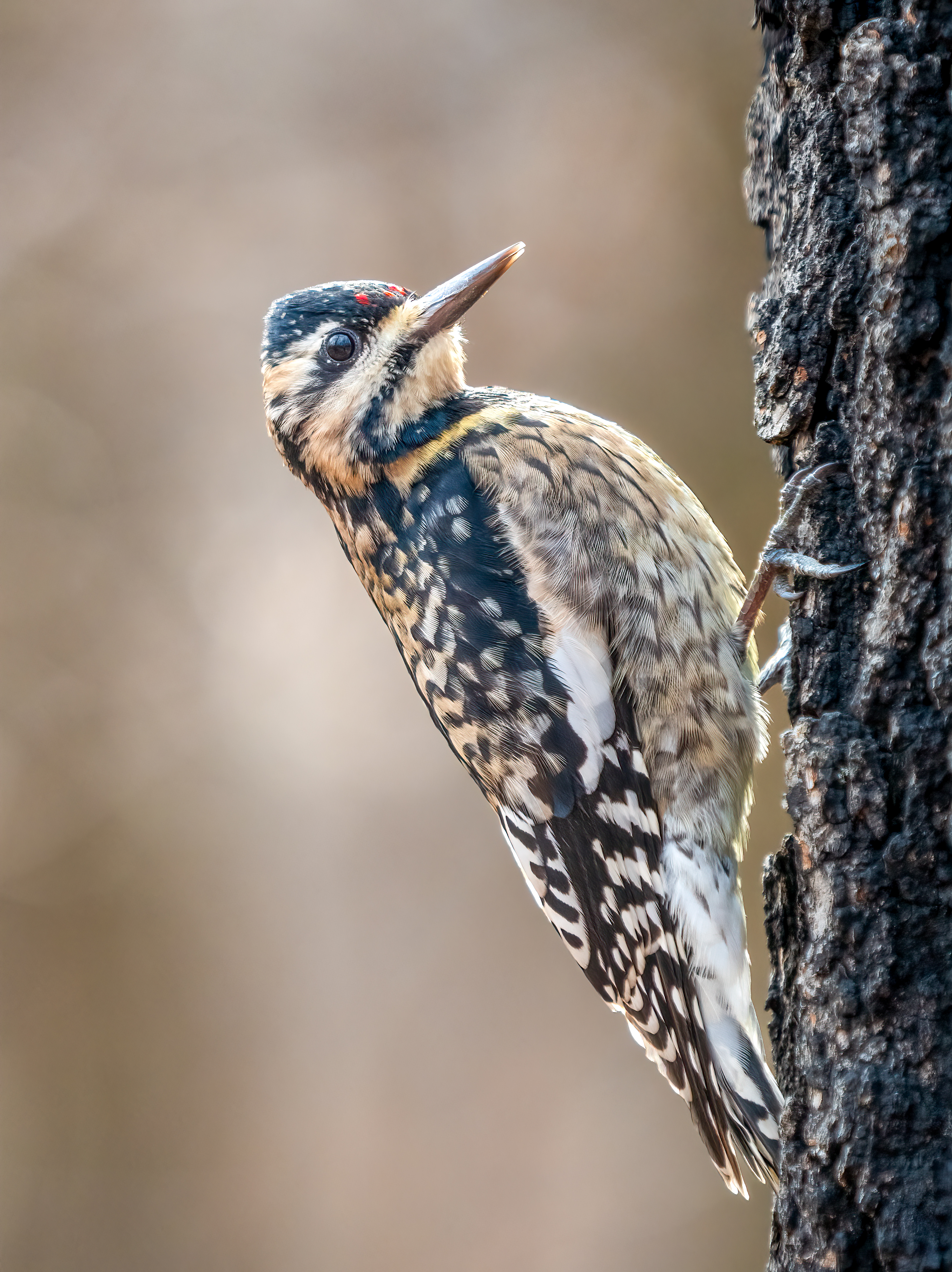
juvenile, Brooklyn USA

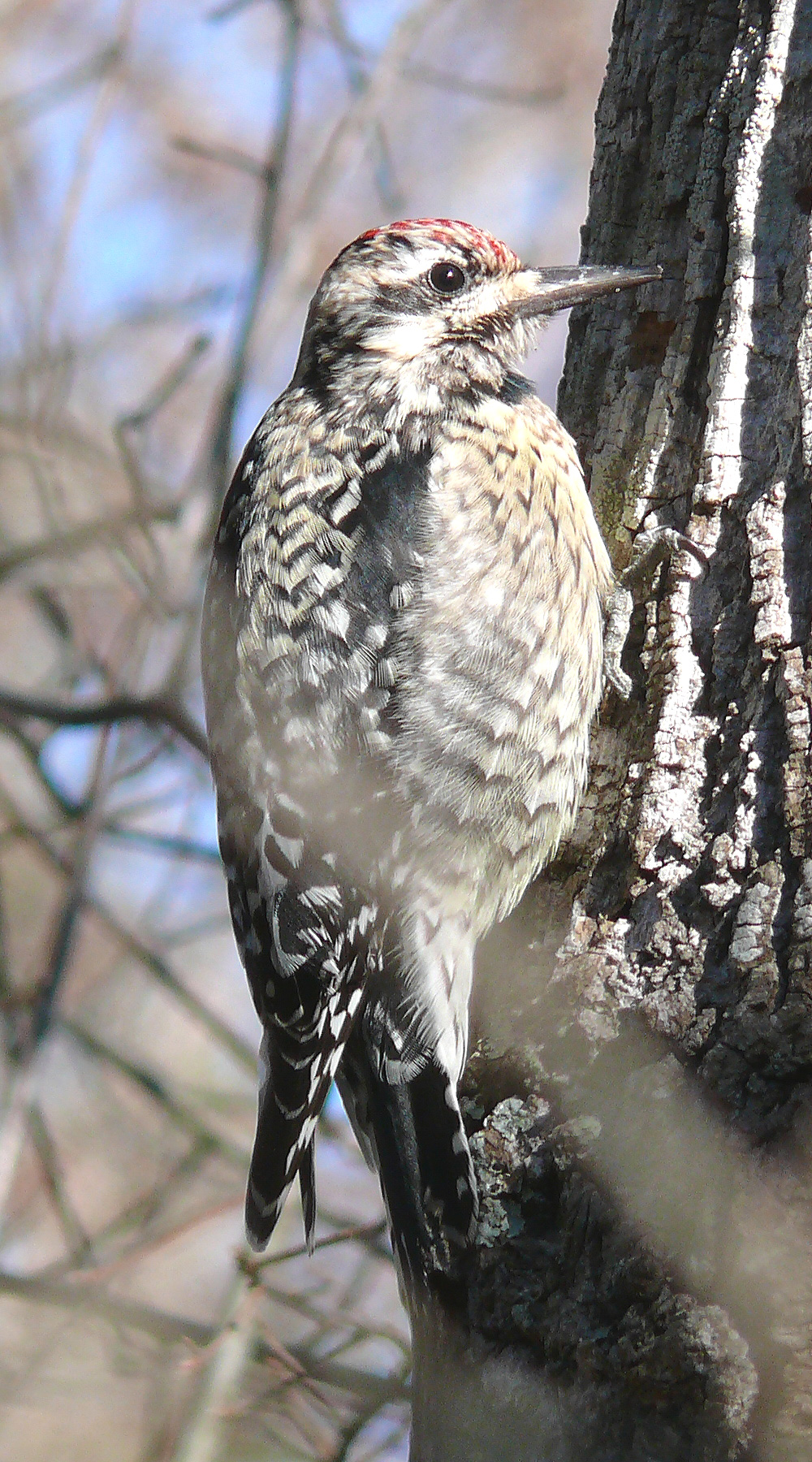
Molting juvenile female

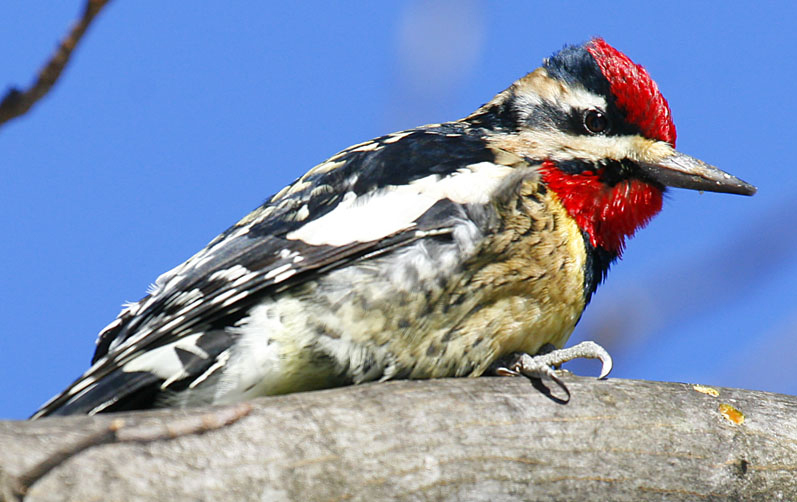
Male

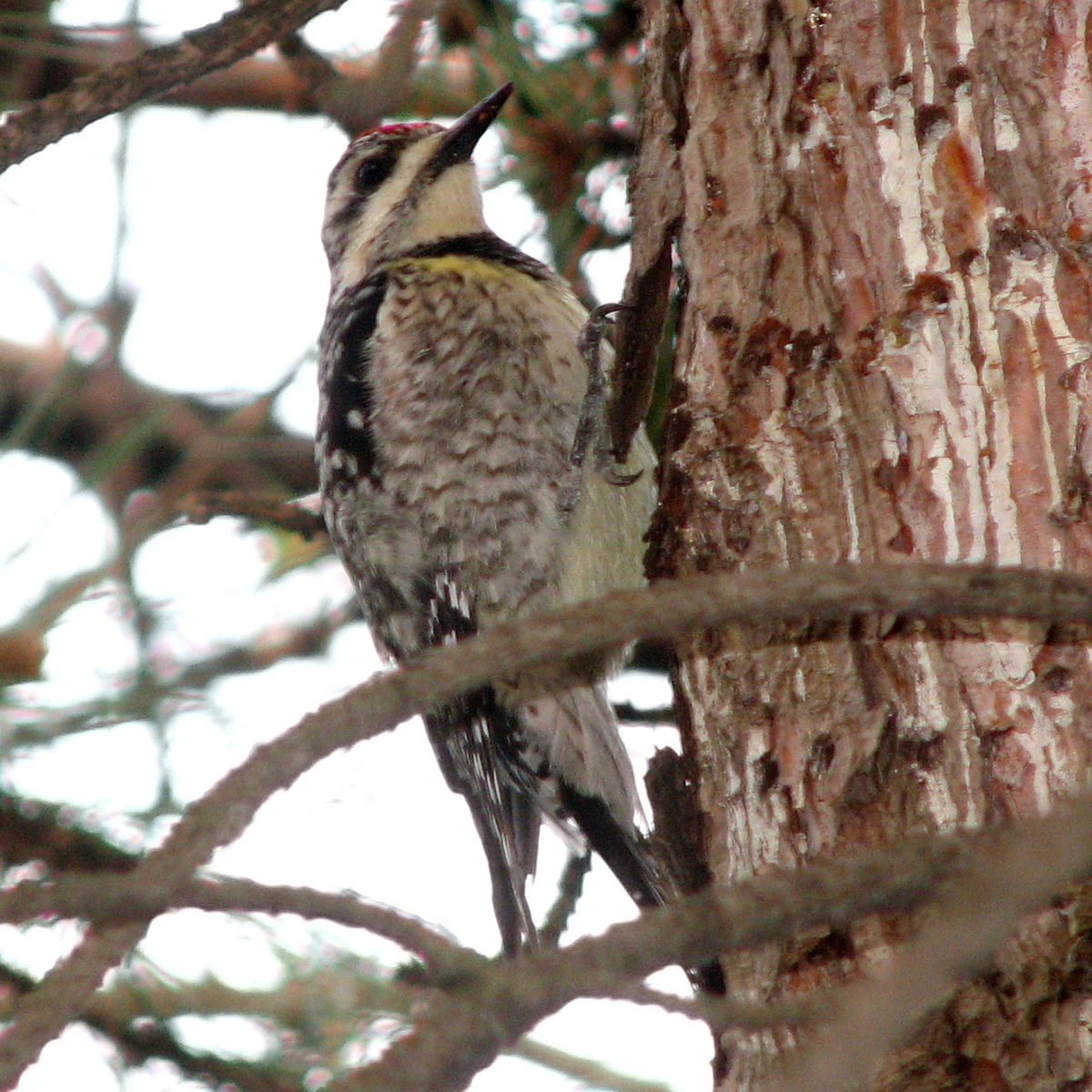
female, Ottawa, Canada

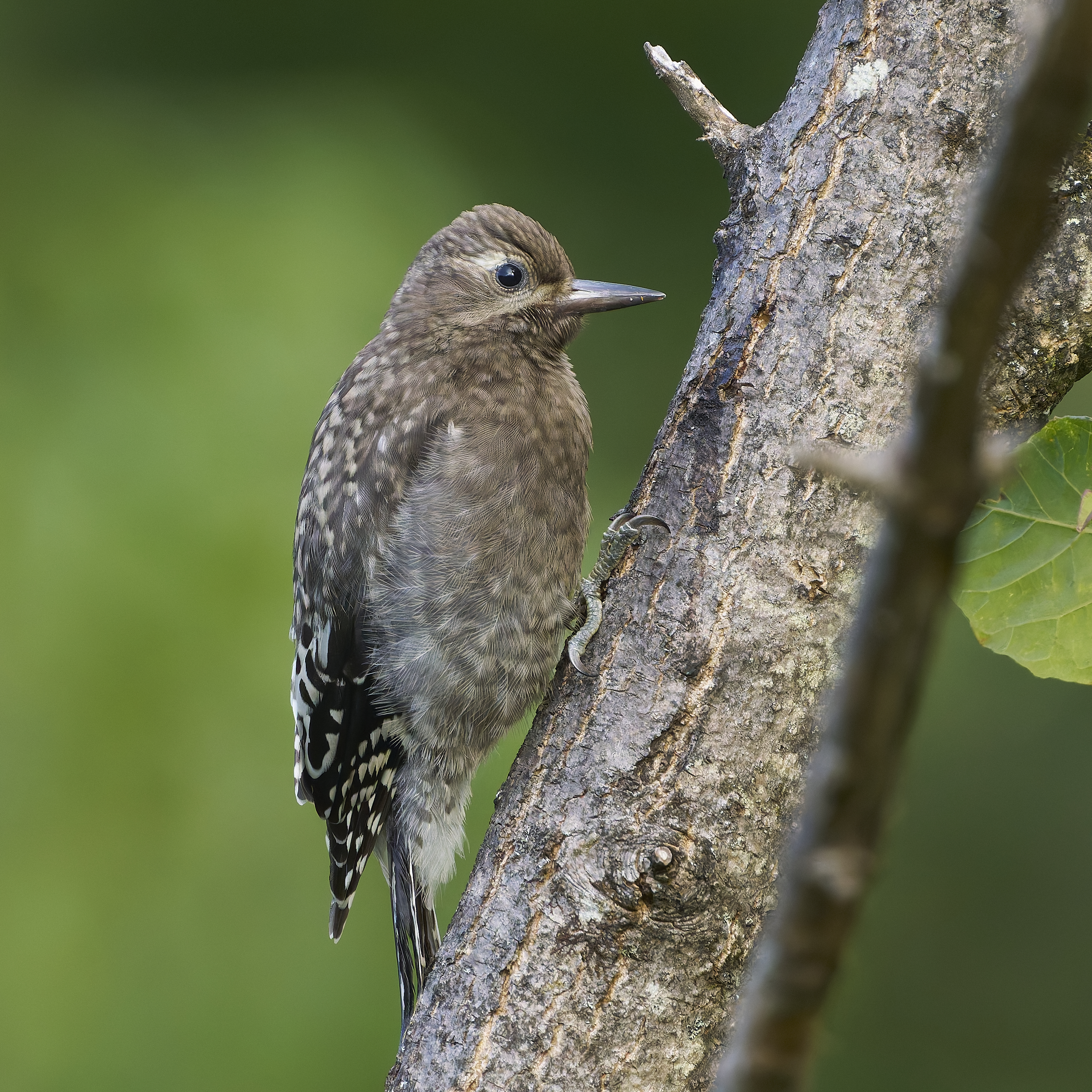
Juvenile. Lenox, MA
