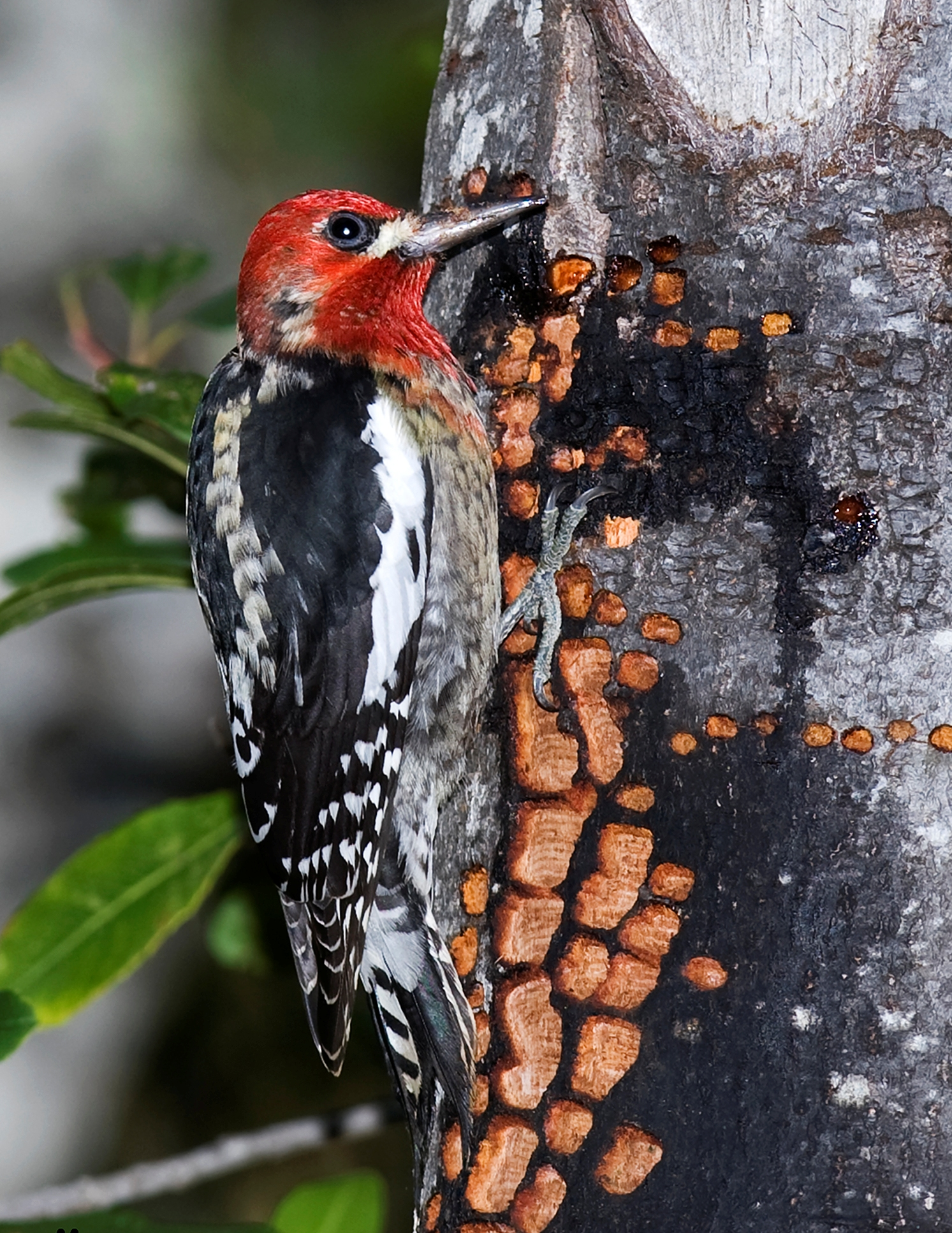
- Red-breasted sapsucker

Scientific classification
- Kingdom: Animalia
- Phylum: Chordata
- Class: Aves
- Order: Piciformes
- Family: Picidae
- Tribe: Melanerpini
- Genus: Sphyrapicus; S.F. Baird, 1858

Type species
- Pica varius Linnaeus, 1766

Species
- Sphyrapicus varius Sphyrapicus nuchalis Sphyrapicus ruber Sphyrapicus thyroideus

= Sapsucker =

Sapsuckers

Genus of birds

The sapsuckers are species of North American woodpeckers in the genus Sphyrapicus.

== Taxonomy and systematics ==
The genus Sphyrapicus was introduced in 1858 by the American naturalist Spencer Baird with the yellow-bellied sapsucker (Sphyrapicus varius) as the type species. The genus name combines the Ancient Greek sphura meaning "hammer" and pikos meaning "woodpecker". The genus is sister to the genus Melanerpes; both genera are members of the tribe Melanerpini in the woodpecker subfamily Picinae.

There are four currently recognized species in the genus:

Genus Sphyrapicus – S.F. Baird, 1858 – four species
Common name	Scientific name and subspecies	Range	Size and ecology	IUCN status and estimated population
Red-naped sapsucker Male Female	Sphyrapicus nuchalis Baird, 1858	the Rocky Mountains and Great Basin areas of North America	Size: Habitat: Diet:	LC
Red-breasted sapsucker	Sphyrapicus ruber (Gmelin, JF, 1788) Two subspecies: S. r. ruber (Gmelin, JF, 1788); S. r. daggetti Grinnell, 1901	southeast Alaska and British Columbia south through the Pacific Coast Ranges of western Washington and Oregon and northern California	Size: Habitat: Diet:	LC
Williamson's sapsucker Male Female	Sphyrapicus thyroideus (Cassin, 1852) Two subspecies: Sphyrapicus thyroideus nataliae (Malherbe, 1854); Sphyrapicus thyroideus thyroideus (Cassin, 1852)	western North America from northern Mexico as far north as British Columbia	Size: Habitat: Diet:	LC
Yellow-bellied sapsucker Male Female	Sphyrapicus varius (Linnaeus, 1766)	Canada, eastern Alaska and the northeastern United States	Size: Habitat: Diet:	LC

== Description ==
The members of this genus are slender birds with stiff tails and relatively long wings. Their typical pattern in flight is undulating, alternating between quick bursts of wing beats and short dips with wings tucked against the body.

== Behavior ==
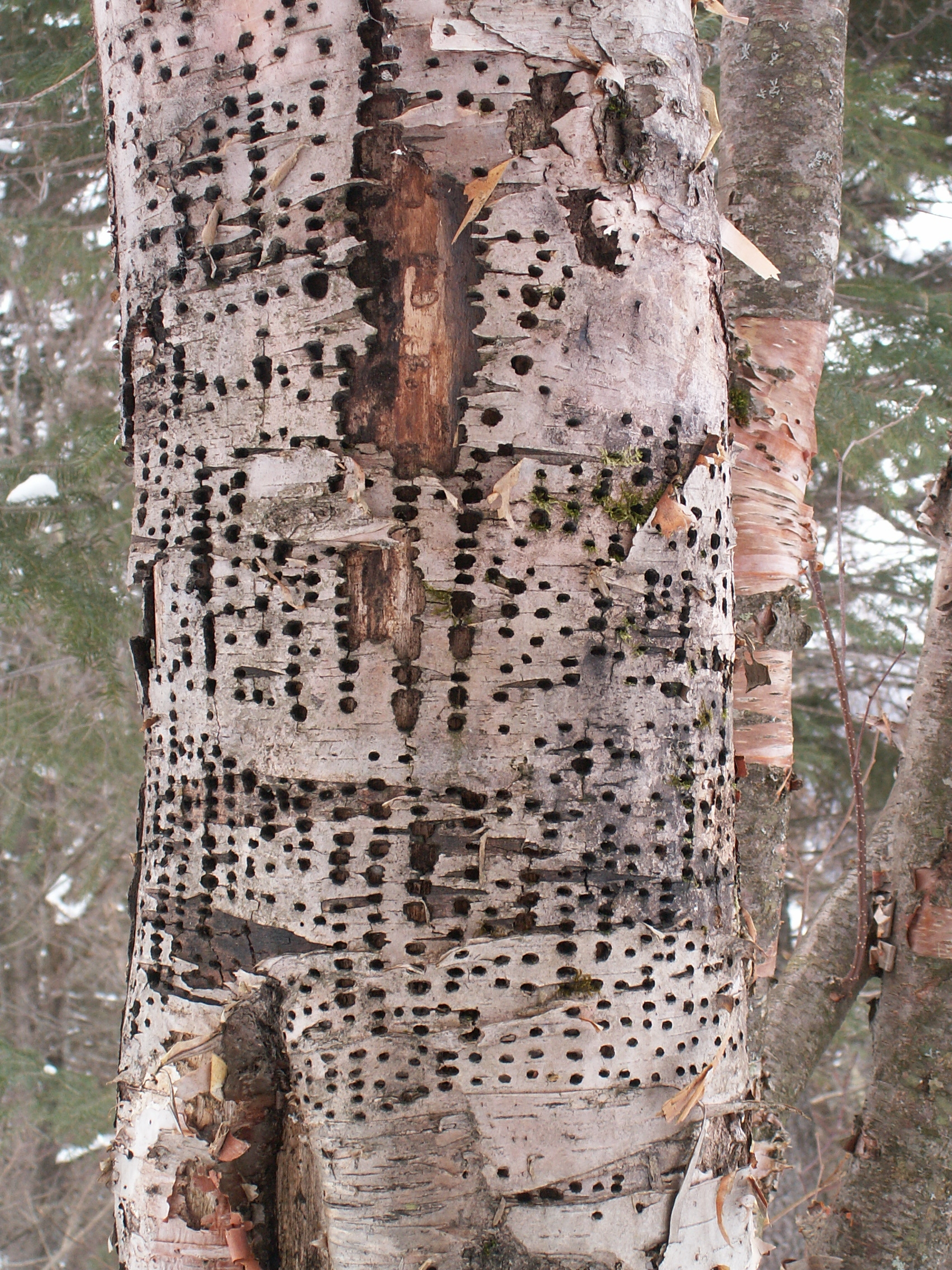
Holes left by a sapsucker

As their name implies, sapsuckers feed primarily on the sap of trees, moving among different tree and shrub species on a seasonal basis. Insects, especially those attracted to the sweet sap exuding from sap holes, are often captured and fed to the young during the breeding season. The most easily recognized sap holes are found in birch trees during the breeding season.

Because sapsuckers attack living trees, they are often considered a pest species. Intensive feeding by sapsuckers is a cause of severe tree damage and mortality, with certain tree species more adversely affected by feeding than others. A USDA Forest Service study found that 67 percent of gray birch (Betula populifolia) trees damaged by yellow-bellied sapsuckers later died of their injuries. This compares to a mortality of 51 percent for paper birch (Betula papyrifera), 40 percent for red maple (Acer rubrum), 3 percent for red spruce (Picea rubens), and 1 percent for hemlock (Tsuga canadensis).
