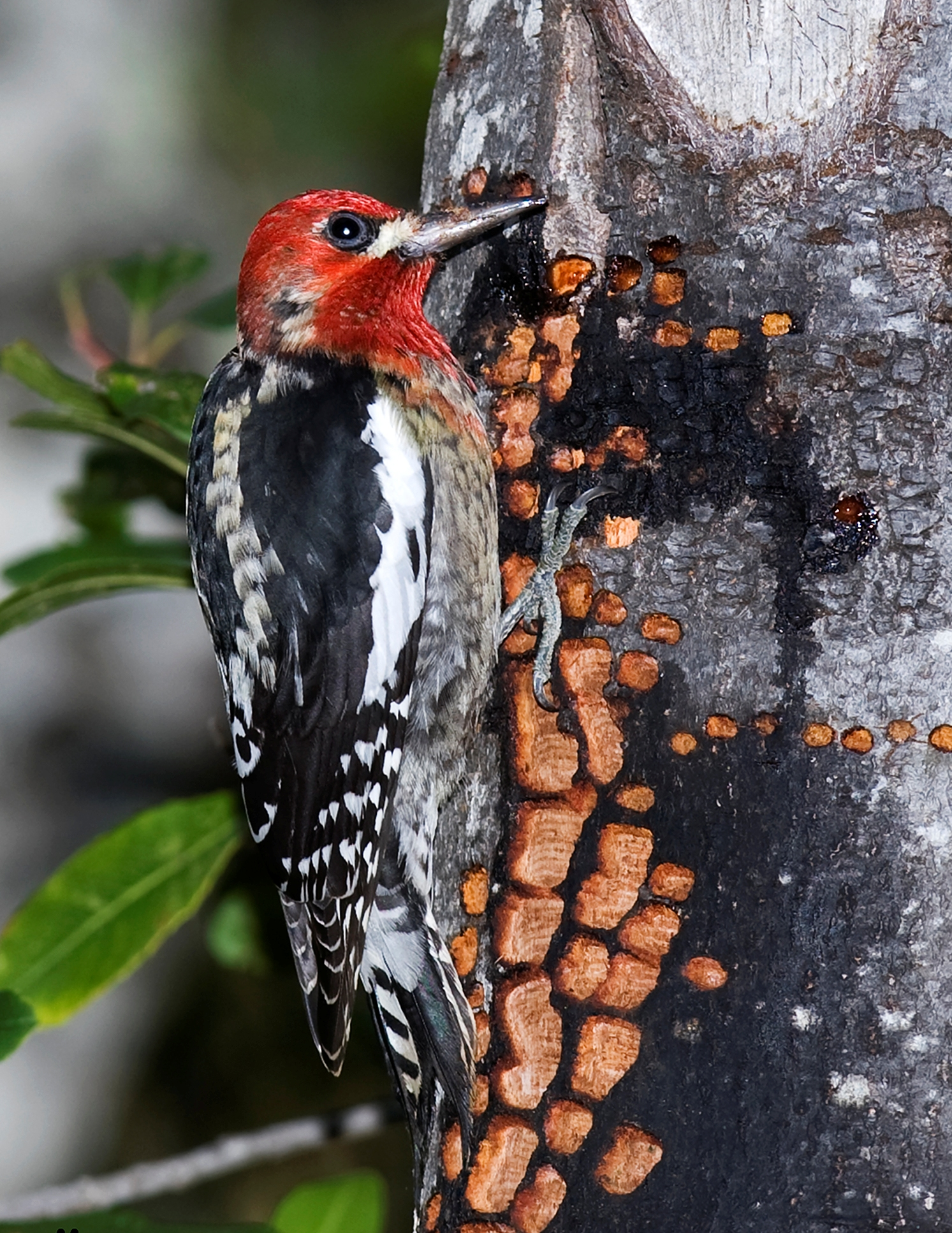

Conservation status
- Least Concern (IUCN 3.1)

Scientific classification
- Kingdom: Animalia
- Phylum: Chordata
- Class: Aves
- Order: Piciformes
- Family: Picidae
- Genus: Sphyrapicus
- Species: S. ruber

Binomial name
- Sphyrapicus ruber (Gmelin, JF, 1788)
- Breeding Year-round Nonbreeding

= Red-breasted sapsucker =

Species of bird

The red-breasted sapsucker (Sphyrapicus ruber) is a medium-sized woodpecker of the forests of the west coast of North America.

== Taxonomy ==
The red-breasted sapsucker was formally described in 1788 by German naturalist Johann Friedrich Gmelin in his revised and expanded edition of Carl Linnaeus's Systema Naturae. He placed it with the woodpeckers in the genus Picus and coined the binomial name Picus ruber. The specific epithet is Latin meaning "red". Gmelin based his description on the "red-breasted woodpecker" that had been described in 1782 by the English ornithologist John Latham in his A General Synopsis of Birds. Latham mistakenly believed that his specimen had come from Cayenne in French Guiana. The type locality has been designated as Nootka Sound in the Canadian province of British Columbia. The red-breasted sapsucker is now one of four species placed in the genus Sphyrapicus that was introduced in 1858 by the American naturalist Spencer Baird.

The red-breasted sapsucker, the red-naped sapsucker (Sphyrapicus nuchalis), and the yellow-bellied sapsucker (Sphyrapicus varius) were formerly treated as a single species, the yellow-bellied sapsucker. The red-breasted and red-naped sapsuckers interbreed where their ranges overlap. Sapsuckers are in the Picidae, or woodpecker, family, in the order Piciformes.

Two subspecies are recognised:

- S. r. ruber (Gmelin, JF, 1788) – south Alaska to west Oregon
- S. r. daggetti Grinnell, 1901 – southwest USA

== Description ==
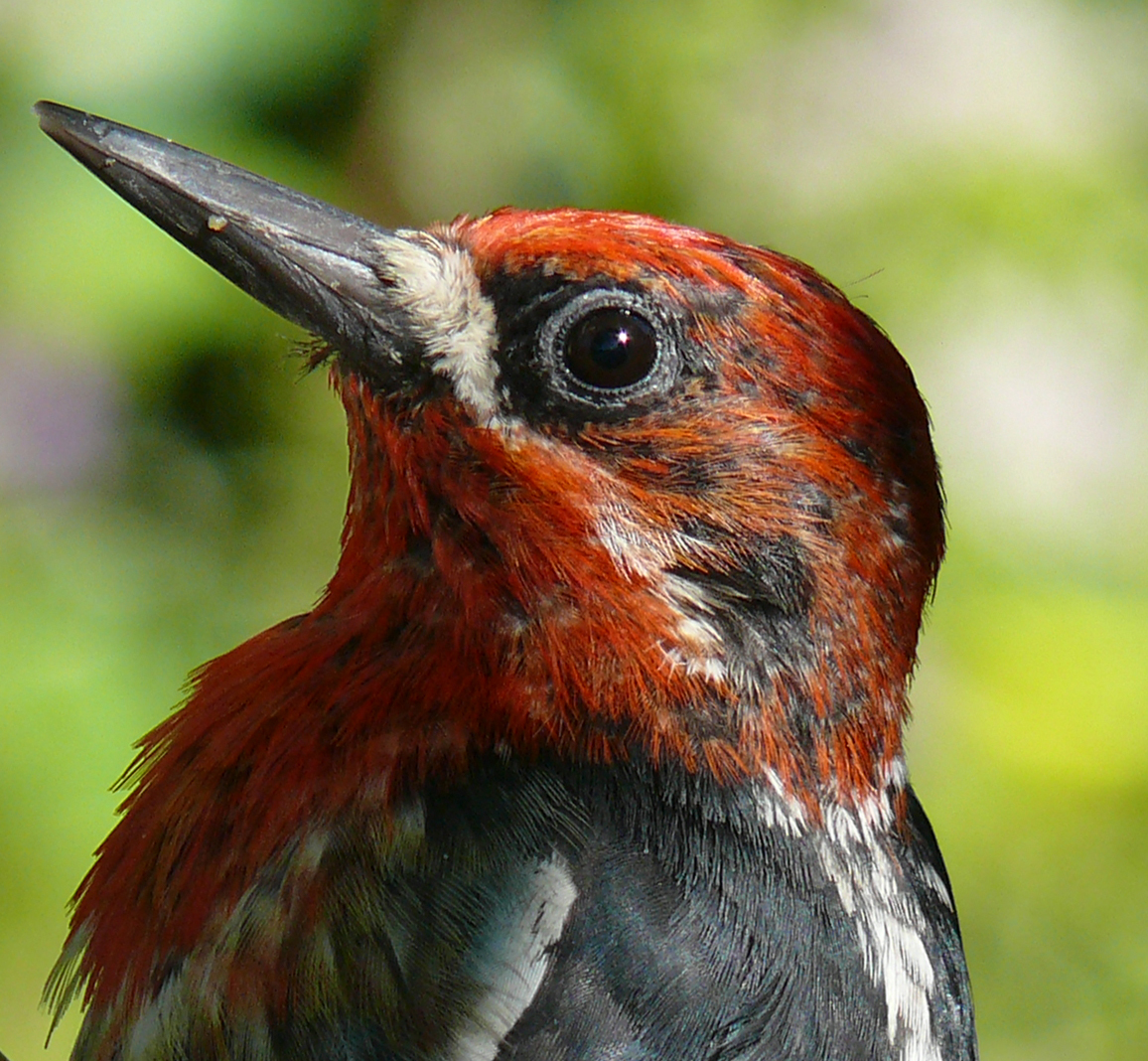
In British Columbia, Canada

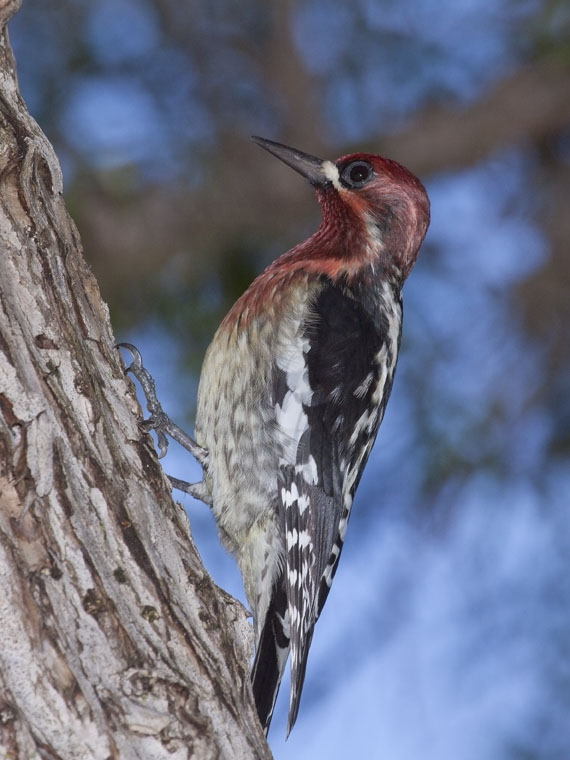
In California, USA

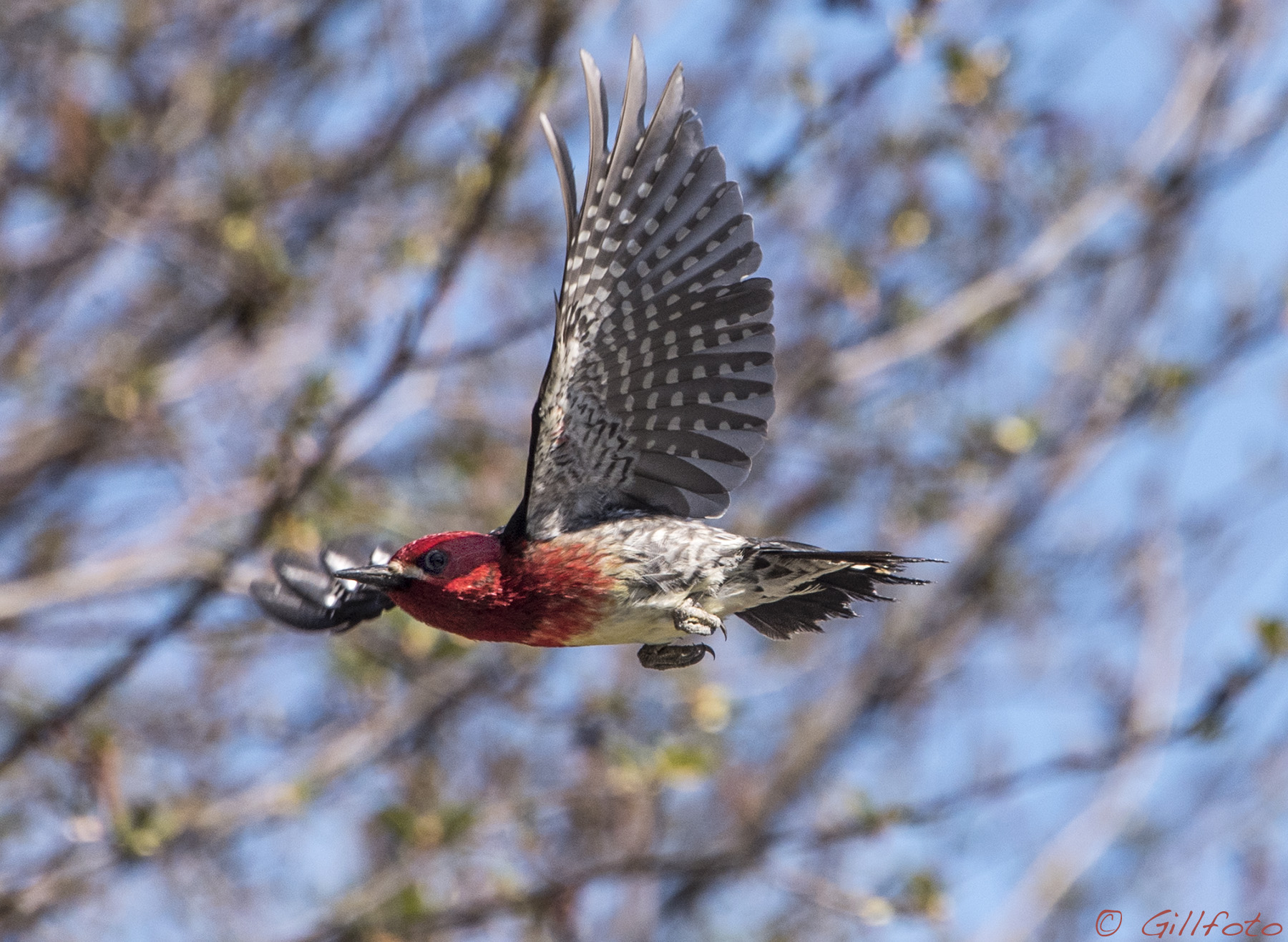
In southeast Alaska

Adults have a red head and upper chest, with a white lower belly and rump. They are black on the back and wings with bars and have a large white wing patch. The northern birds, subspecies S. r. ruber, have yellow bars on the back and yellow upper belly. The southern birds, subspecies S. r. daggetti, have white bars on the back and a pale belly. The wing barring is white in both variants.

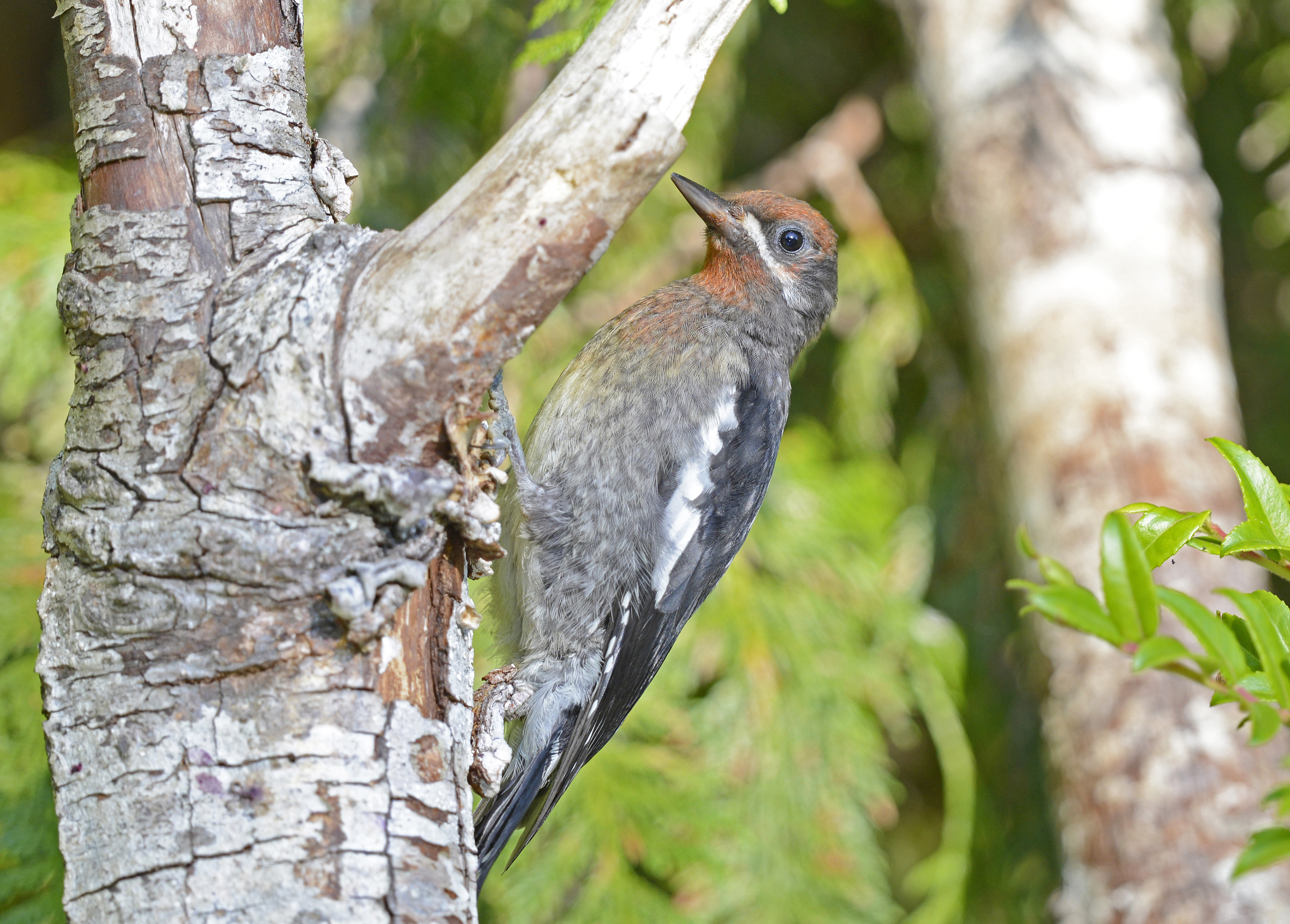
Juvenile sapsucker

These birds make various noises; their vocalizations include a variety of chatter, squeals, and scream-like calls, and they also drum with their bills on various surfaces. Many of these noises serve to establish territory and attract a mate. This is in addition to the noise made by drilling holes for feeding and by excavating nest cavities.

== Distribution and habitat ==
Red-breasted sapsuckers breed from southeast Alaska and British Columbia south through the Pacific Coast Ranges of western Washington and Oregon and northern California. The breeding habitat is usually forest that includes pine, hemlock, Douglas fir, fir, and spruce, though they are known to use other woodland habitats. They prefer old-growth forest. They require living trees to provide the sap on which they feed.

=== Migration ===
The birds that breed in the northern part of the range migrate south in the winter, and individuals that breed in inland and upland locales often move to the coastal lowlands in winter, where the weather is milder. Winter habitat can be deciduous or coniferous woodland. This species' winter range extends south to Baja California in Mexico.

== Behaviour and ecology ==
=== Feeding ===
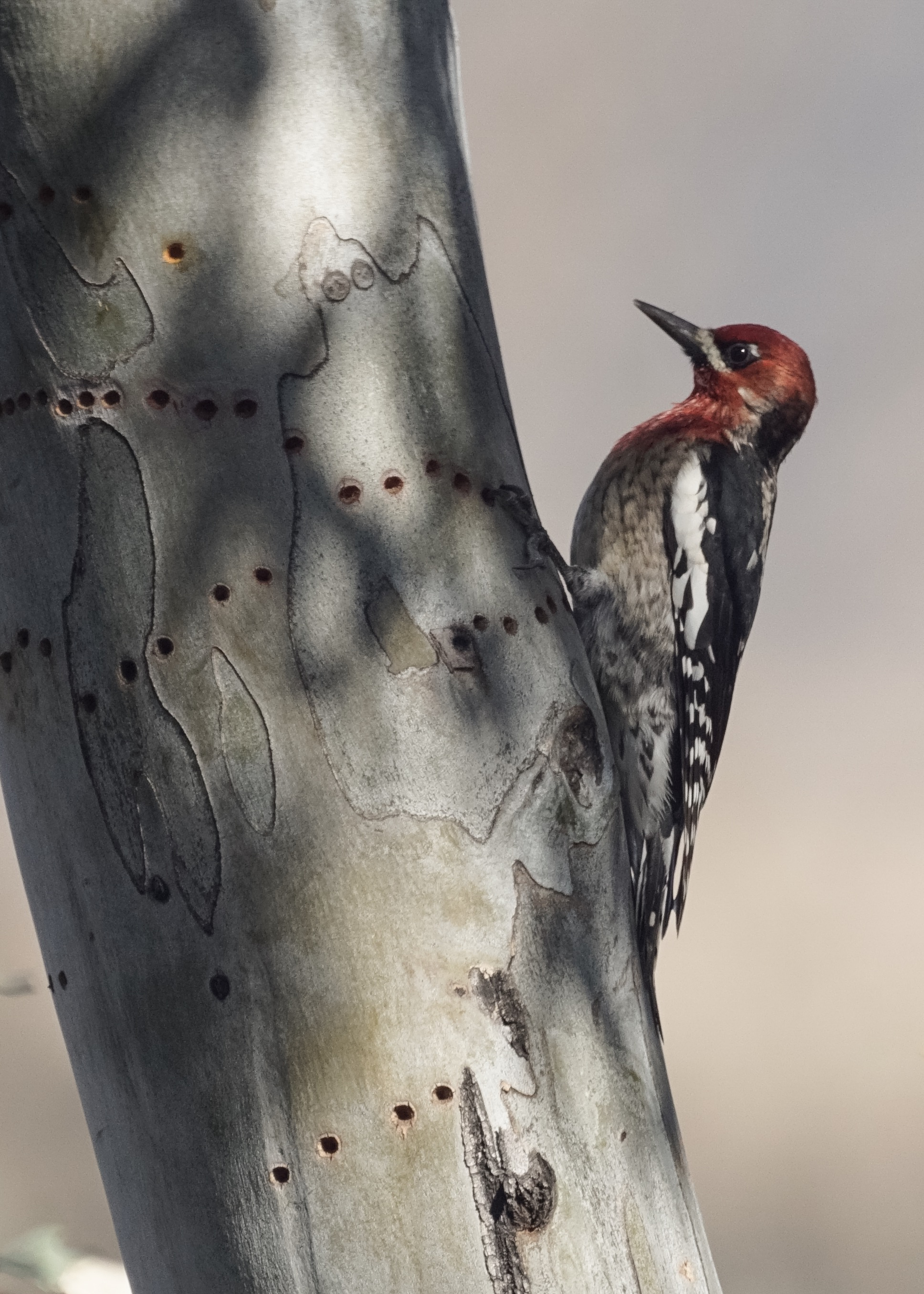
Multiple rows of holes can be seen on the side of the tree, created by this red-breasted sapsucker in Yucaipa Regional Park.

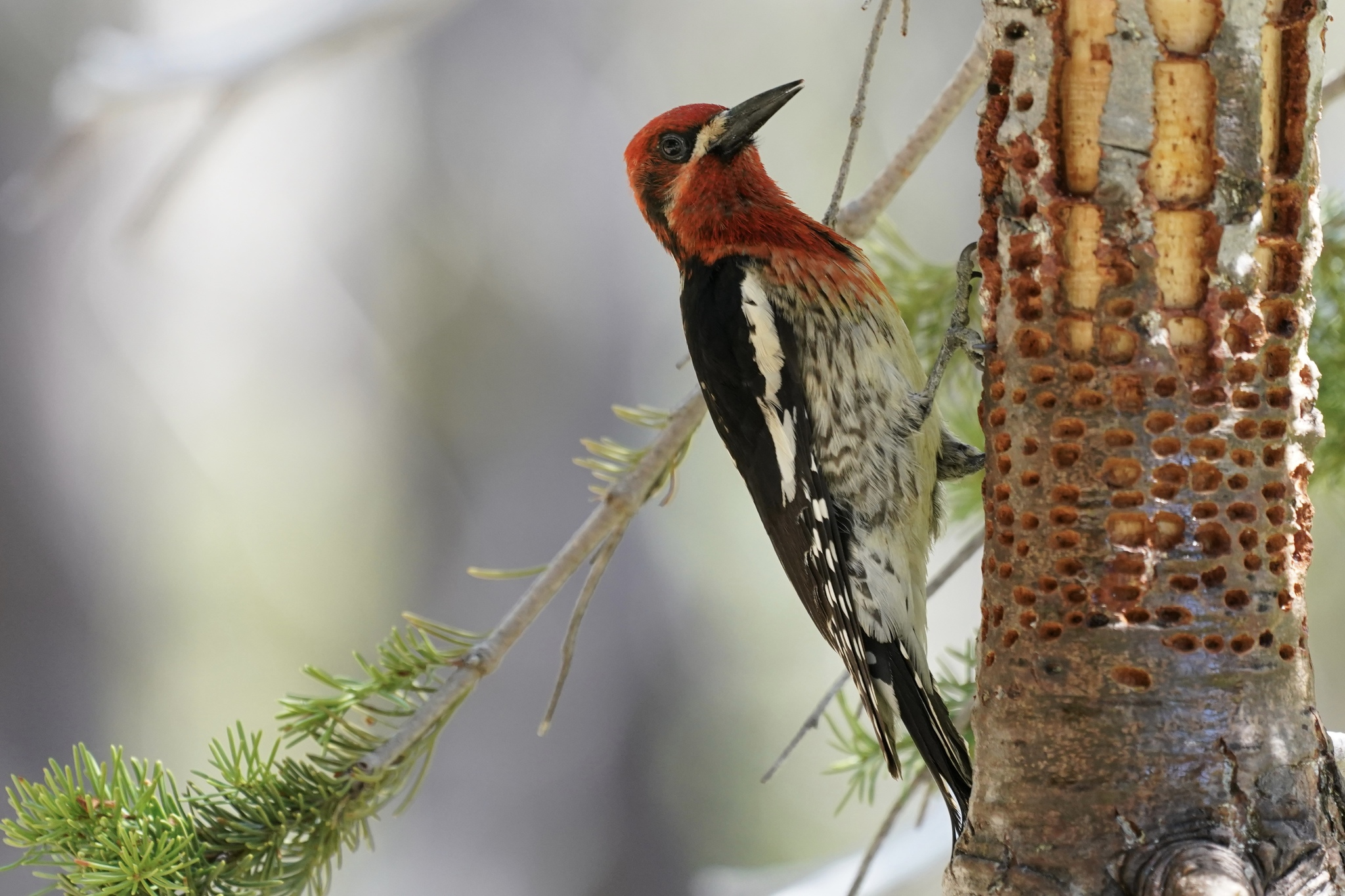
Sapsuckers can sometimes cause extensive damage to trees.

A sapsucker's tongue is adapted with stiff hairs for collecting sap. Red-breasted sapsuckers visit the same tree multiple times, drilling holes in neat horizontal rows. A bird will leave and come back later, when the sap has started flowing from the holes. Repeated visits over an extended period of time can actually kill the tree. The insects attracted to the sap are also consumed, and not only by sapsuckers; Rufous hummingbirds, for example, have been observed to follow the movements of sapsuckers and take advantage of this food source.

=== Breeding ===
Red-breasted sapsuckers nest in tree cavities. They begin work on creating a nest hole in a dead, usually deciduous tree, in April or May and produce one brood per breeding season. The female lays four to seven pure white eggs. Both parents feed the young, and the fledglings leave the nest at 23–28 days old. The nest cavity is not reused.
