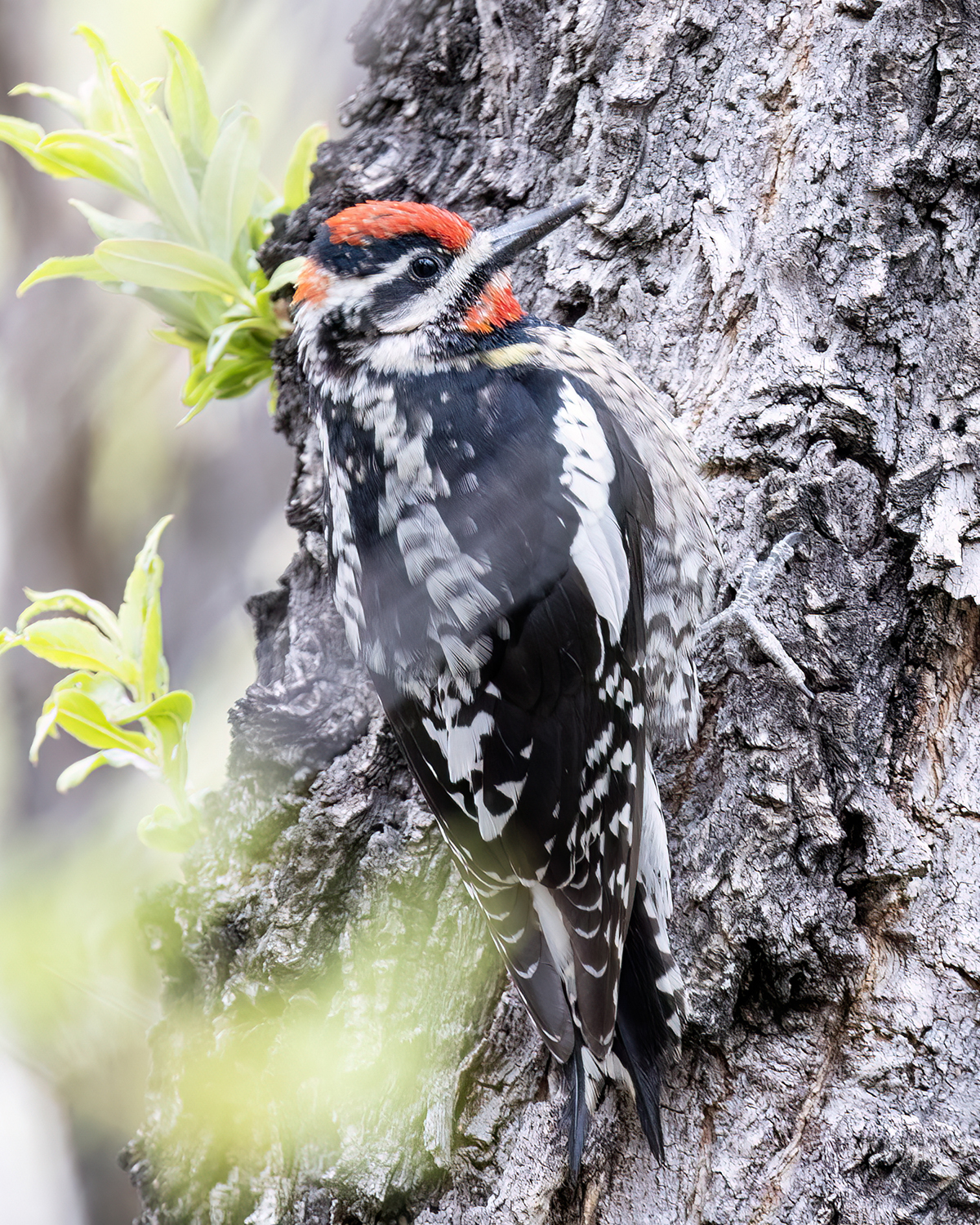
- Adult male

Conservation status
- Least Concern (IUCN 3.1)

Scientific classification
- Kingdom: Animalia
- Phylum: Chordata
- Class: Aves
- Order: Piciformes
- Family: Picidae
- Genus: Sphyrapicus
- Species: S. nuchalis

Binomial name
- Sphyrapicus nuchalis Baird, 1858

= Red-naped sapsucker =

Species of bird

The red-naped sapsucker (Sphyrapicus nuchalis) is a medium-sized North American woodpecker. Long thought to be a subspecies of the yellow-bellied sapsucker, it is now known to be a distinct species.

== Systematics ==
The red-naped sapsucker is one of four North American woodpeckers in the genus Sphyrapicus. It has no subspecies. First described by Spencer Fullerton Baird in 1858, it was initially thought to be a subspecies of the yellow-bellied sapsucker. However, there are significant genetic differences between this species and the yellow-bellied sapsucker, and the American Ornithologists' Union recognized it as a distinct species in the seventh edition of its North American birds checklist, published in 1998. Genetic analysis has shown that the red-naped sapsucker is a sister species with (and very closely related to) the red-breasted sapsucker, and that these two species form a superspecies with the yellow-bellied sapsucker. All three species are known to hybridize with each other, with hybrids between red-naped and red-breasted sapsuckers proving particularly common.

The genus name Sphyrapicus is a combination of the Greek words sphura, meaning "hammer" and pikos, meaning "woodpecker". The specific name nuchalis is a modern Latin word meaning "of the nape". In its common name, "red-naped", refers to the red patch on the back of the bird's head, while "sapsucker" refers to its distinctive method of feeding.

== Description ==
The red-naped sapsucker is a medium-sized woodpecker, measuring 19–21 cm (7.5–8.3 in) long and weighing 32–66 g (1.1–2.3 oz). Adults have a black head with a red forehead, white stripes, and a red spot on the nape; they have a white lower belly and rump. They have a yellow breast and upper belly. They are black on the back and wings with white bars; they have a large white wing patch. Adult males have a red throat patch; for females, the lower part of the throat is red, the upper part white.

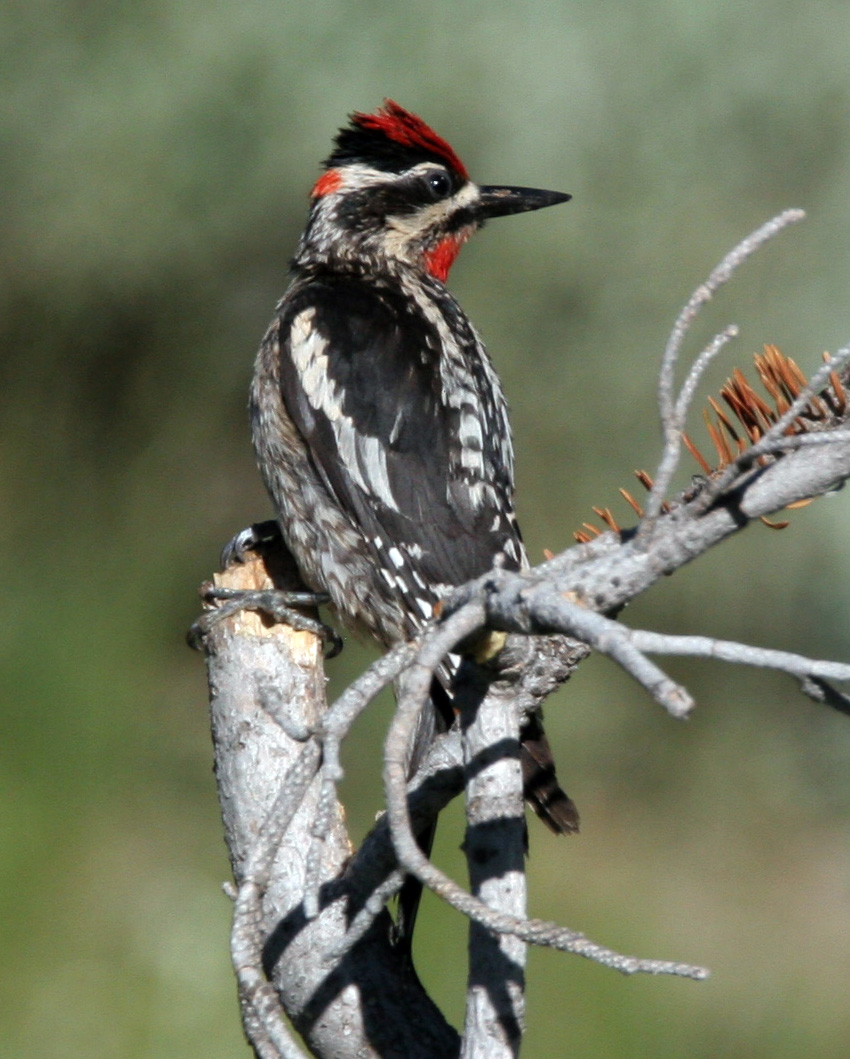
Female, Nevada

== Habitat and range ==
Their breeding habitat is mixed forests in the Rocky Mountains and Great Basin areas of North America. They nest in a cavity in a dead tree. Other species which nest in tree cavities reuse nests formerly used by these birds.

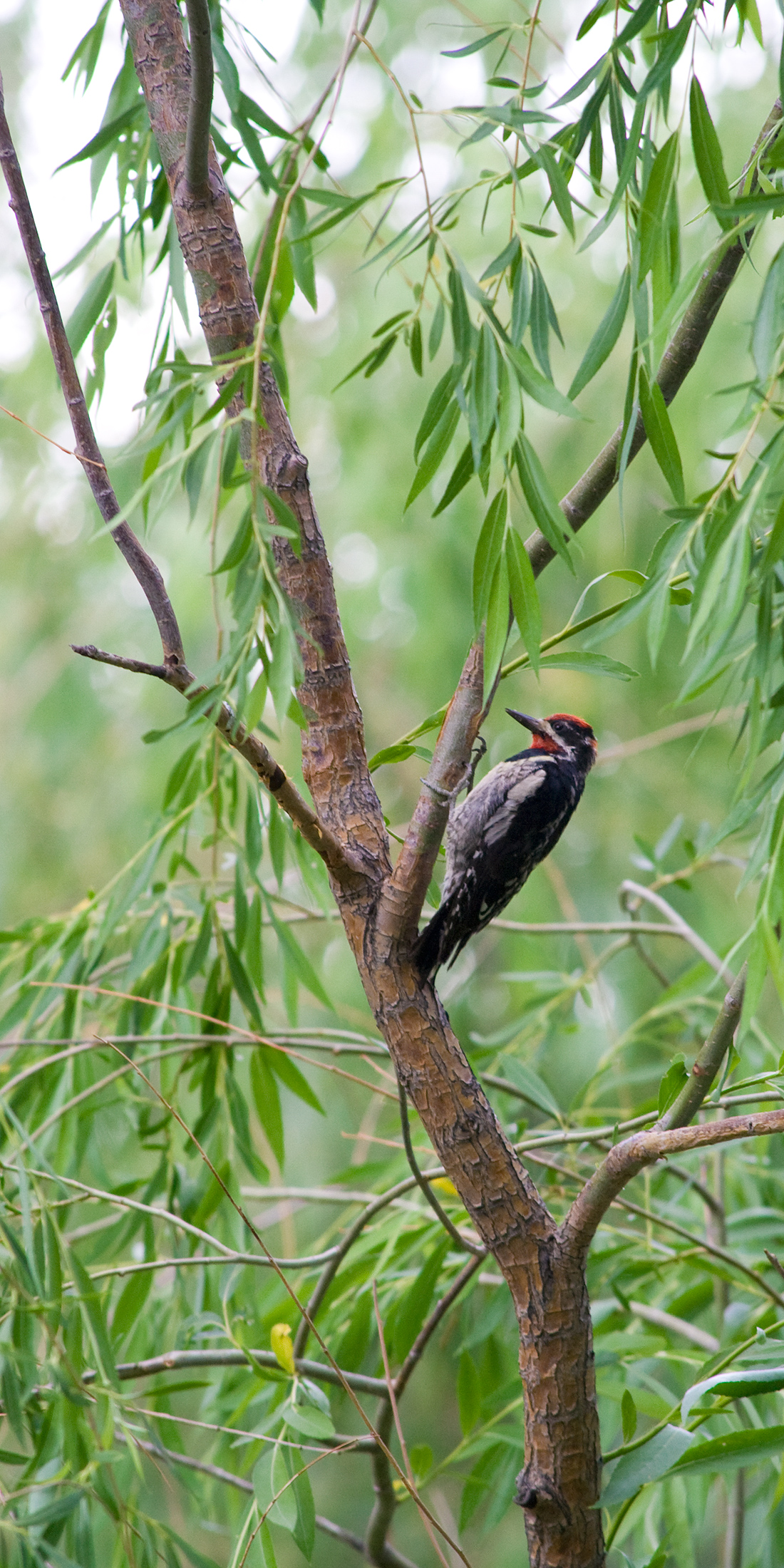

To provide habitat and foraging for woodpeckers, forest management objectives on public land include snag and live tree retention. Numerous studies have shown woodpeckers will readily nest in logged areas as long as some stands are left standing. The drastic change in forest habitat caused by logging and tree retention drastically effects the quality of nesting sites and is detrimental to the red-naped sapsuckers habitat.

These birds migrate south and vacate areas at higher elevations.

== Behavior ==
=== Feeding ===
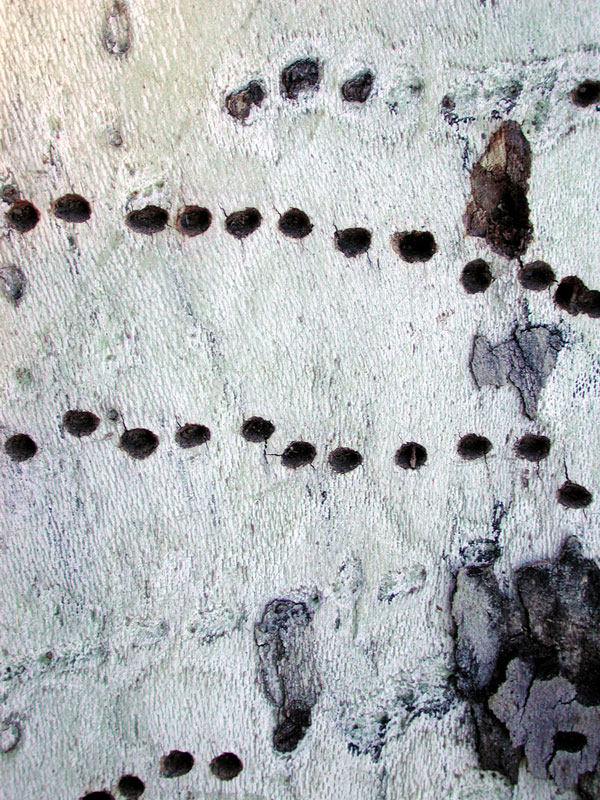
Holes drilled by a red-naped sapsucker in Platanus wrightii in Arizona, US

True to their name, and like other sapsuckers, they drill holes in trees and eat the sap as well as insects attracted to it. They sometimes catch insects in flight; they also eat seeds and berries.

=== Breeding ===
Red-naped sapsuckers typically lay 3–7 white eggs. The young are altricial, naked, and helpless. The eggs are incubated for 12–13 days and the young are able to fly and leave the nest 25–29 days after hatching.

Throughout western North America, red-naped sapsucker (Sphyrapicus nuchalis) nests have been described primarily in trembling aspen (Populus tremuloides) with decay-softened wood. Heart-wood decay is reported to infect the roots of most aspens that red-naped sapsuckers choose to excavate for nesting. Red-naped sapsuckers typically excavate their first cavity relatively close to the ground and over subsequent years make progressively higher excavations. Most (68%) nest trees were live and 75% had broken tops. Western larch (Larix occidentalis) and birch were greatly over utilized compared to their availability.
