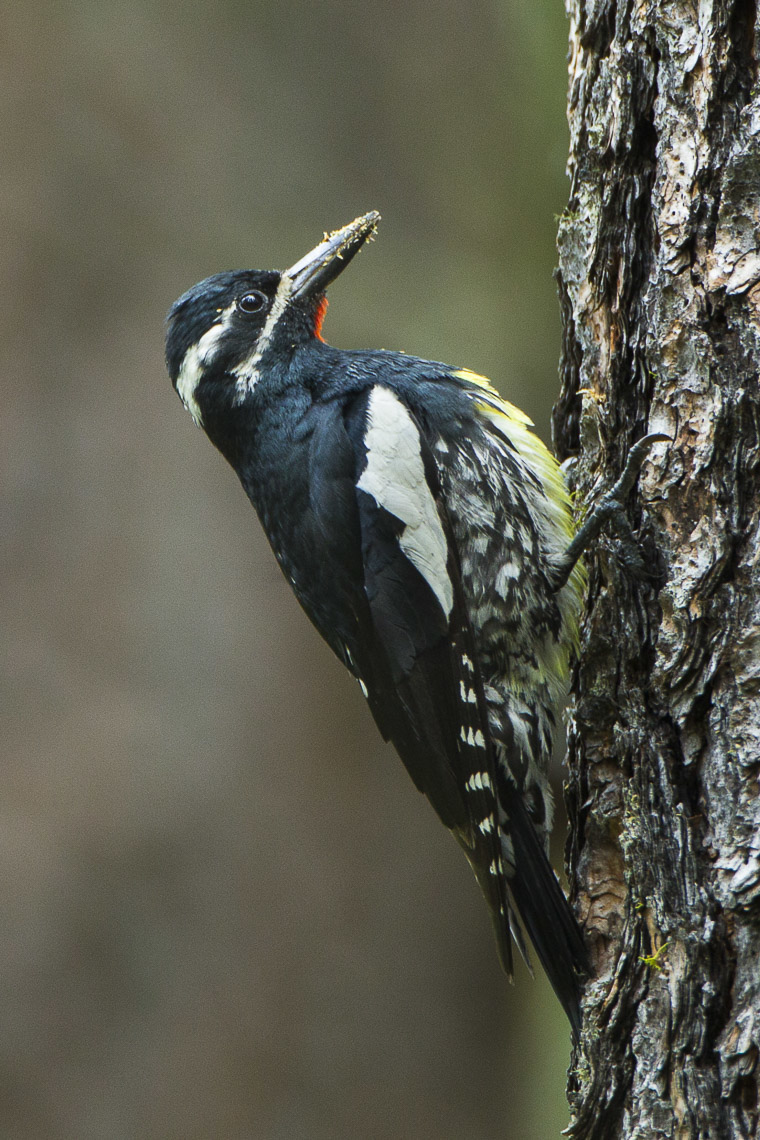
- Male

Conservation status
- Least Concern (IUCN 3.1)

Scientific classification
- Kingdom: Animalia
- Phylum: Chordata
- Class: Aves
- Order: Piciformes
- Family: Picidae
- Genus: Sphyrapicus
- Species: S. thyroideus

Binomial name
- Sphyrapicus thyroideus (Cassin, 1852)

= Williamson's sapsucker =

Species of bird

Williamson's sapsucker (Sphyrapicus thyroideus) is a medium-sized woodpecker belonging to the genus Sphyrapicus (sapsuckers).

== Habitat and range ==
Breeding habitat is open forested areas with conifers, mainly ponderosa pine, douglas-fir, and grand fir. Subalpine fir and western larch may also be important components of good habitat for these birds. Partially migratory, they breed in western North America from northern Mexico as far north as British Columbia. They are permanent residents in some parts of their range; migrating birds form small flocks and may travel as far south as central Mexico.

== Description ==
Adult males are iridescent black on their head, back, sides and tail. They have a white stripe behind the eye and a lower white stripe across each side of the head, a red chin and a bright yellow belly. They have black wings with large white patches. The female is completely different in appearance: mainly black, with a pale yellow breast, a brownish head with black streaking and fine barring on the back, breast and sides. Originally, the female was considered to be a different species and named the black-breasted woodpecker by Cassin.

Measurements:

- Length: 8.3–9.8 in (21–25 cm)
- Weight: 1.6–1.9 oz (44–55 g)
- Wingspan: 17 in (43 cm)

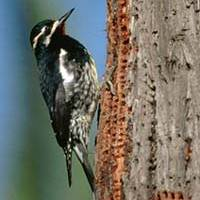
Male with sap wells

They excavate a new nesting cavity each year, sometimes reusing the same tree.

These birds feed on sap, mainly from conifers, but insects are their main food source during the nesting season and they also eat berries outside of the breeding period.

These birds drum to establish territories.

This species may be declining in some parts of its range due to habitat loss.

This woodpecker is associated with mature larch forests in south-central British Columbia; less than 500 individuals breed in Canada. The habitat for this species is rapidly disappearing due to forest harvesting. The species was designated endangered in 2005.

The species took its common name from Lieutenant Robert Stockton Williamson, who was the leader of a surveying expedition which collected the first male. They were trying to identify the best route west for a railway to the Pacific Ocean.

== Subspecies ==
- Sphyrapicus thyroideus nataliae (Malherbe, 1854)
- Sphyrapicus thyroideus thyroideus (Cassin, 1852)

In the nineteenth century, the males and females of this sapsucker were believed to be separate species. The female was first described 1852 as Picus thyroideus, and the male was described in 1857 (Newberry) as Picus williamsonii. Baird appropriated the name Sphyrapicus as the genus for both in 1858. In 1873 Henry Henshaw clarified this matter and recognized them as the same species. This is also summarized in Robert Ridgway's 'The Birds of North and Middle America, Part 6' (1914).
