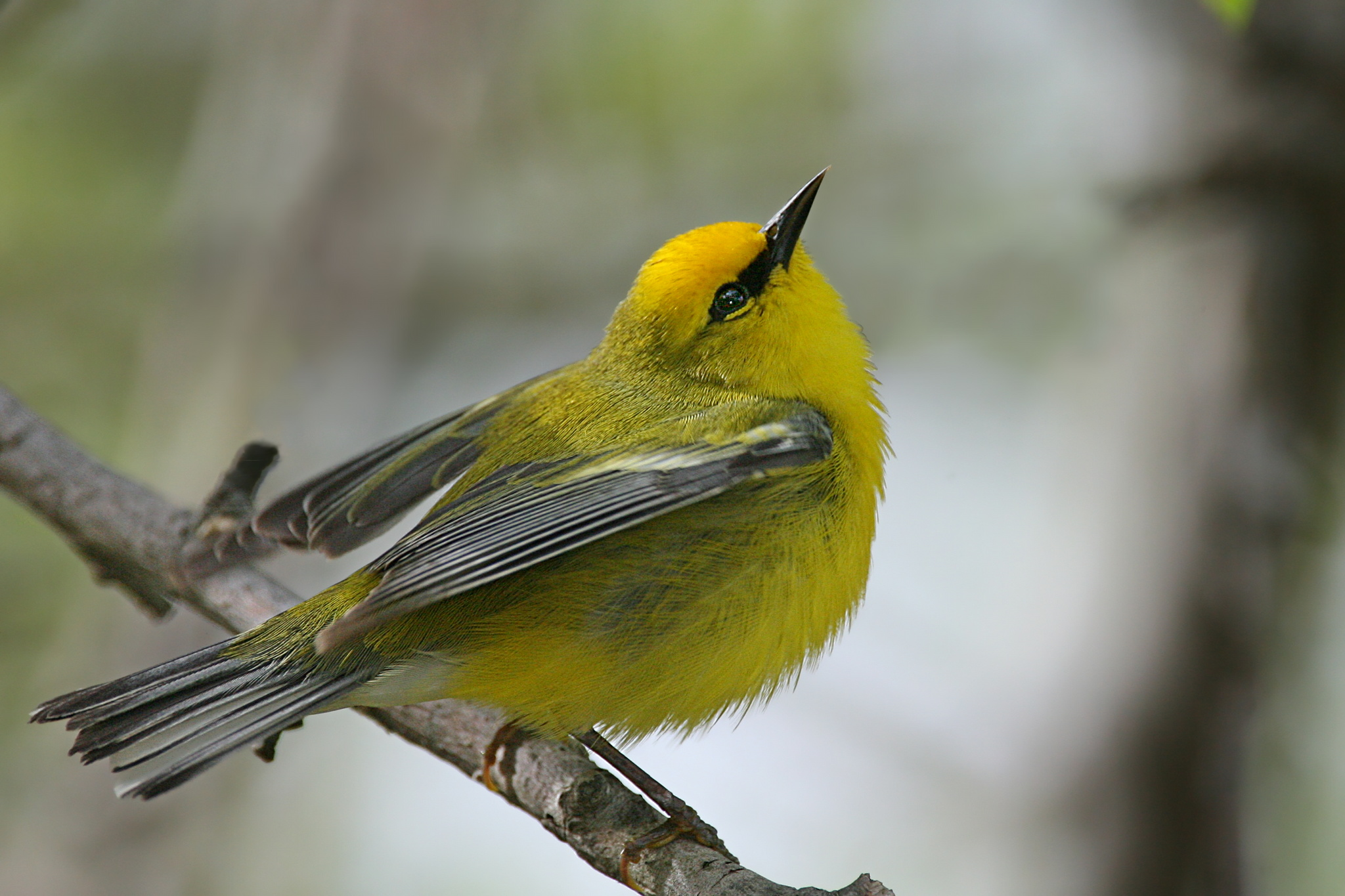
- Blue-winged warbler (Vermivora cyanoptera)

Scientific classification
- Kingdom: Animalia
- Phylum: Chordata
- Class: Aves
- Order: Passeriformes
- Family: Parulidae
- Genus: Vermivora; Swainson, 1827

Type species
- Vermivora solitaria Swainson, 1827

Species
- See text.

= Vermivora =

Genus of birds

Vermivora is a genus of New World warblers.

== Taxonomy ==
The genus Vermivora was introduced in 1827 by the English zoologist William Swainson to accommodate a single species, Vermivora solitaria Swainson. This is Sylvia solitaria Wilson, 1810 which is now Vermivora cyanoptera Olson and Reveal, 2009, the blue-winged warbler. The genus name combines Latin vermis meaning "worm" with -vorus meaning "-eating".

== Species ==
Three species are recognised in the genus, including the (presumed) extinct Bachman's warbler:

Genus Vermivora – Swainson, 1827 – three species
Common name	Scientific name and subspecies	Range	Size and ecology	IUCN status and estimated population
Bachman's warbler	Vermivora bachmanii (Audubon, 1833)	Southeast United States and wintering in Cuba	Size: Habitat: Diet:	CR
Blue-winged warbler	Vermivora cyanoptera Olson & Reveal, 2009	southern Ontario and the eastern United States	Size: Habitat: Diet:	LC
Golden-winged warbler	Vermivora chrysoptera Linnaeus, 1766	south-central Canada and in the Appalachian Mountains in northeastern to north-central United States	Size: Habitat: Diet:	NT

Several additional species were formerly included in Vermivora, but have now been transferred to the genus Leiothlypis:

- Tennessee warbler Leiothlypis peregrina
- Orange-crowned warbler Leiothlypis celata
- Nashville warbler Leiothlypis ruficapilla
- Virginia's warbler Leiothlypis virginiae
- Colima warbler Leiothlypis crissalis
- Lucy's warbler Leiothlypis luciae
