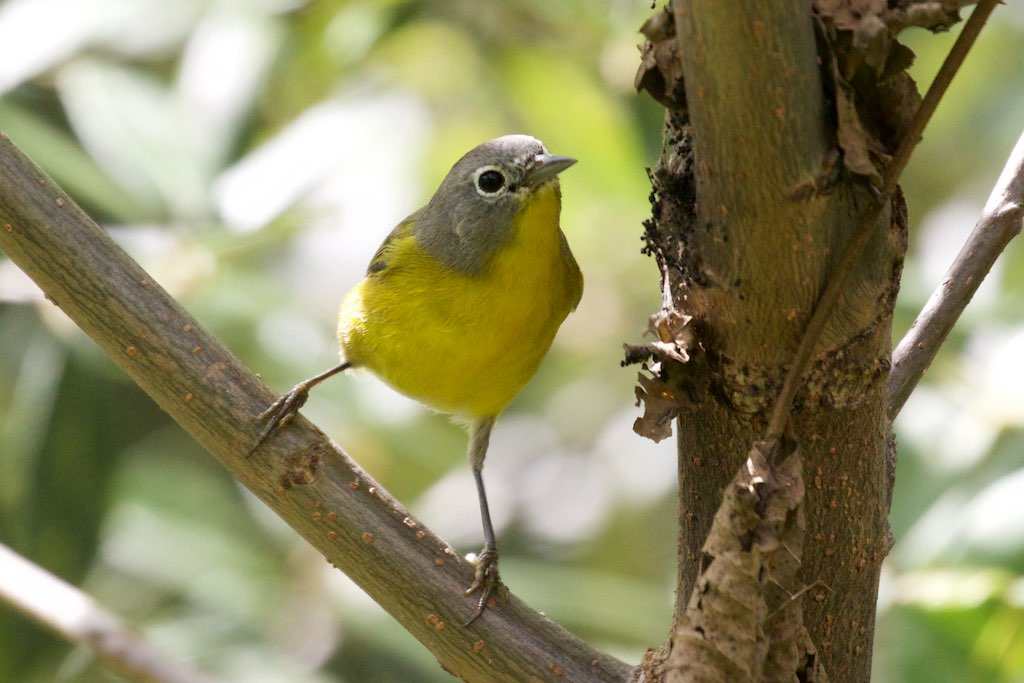
- Male
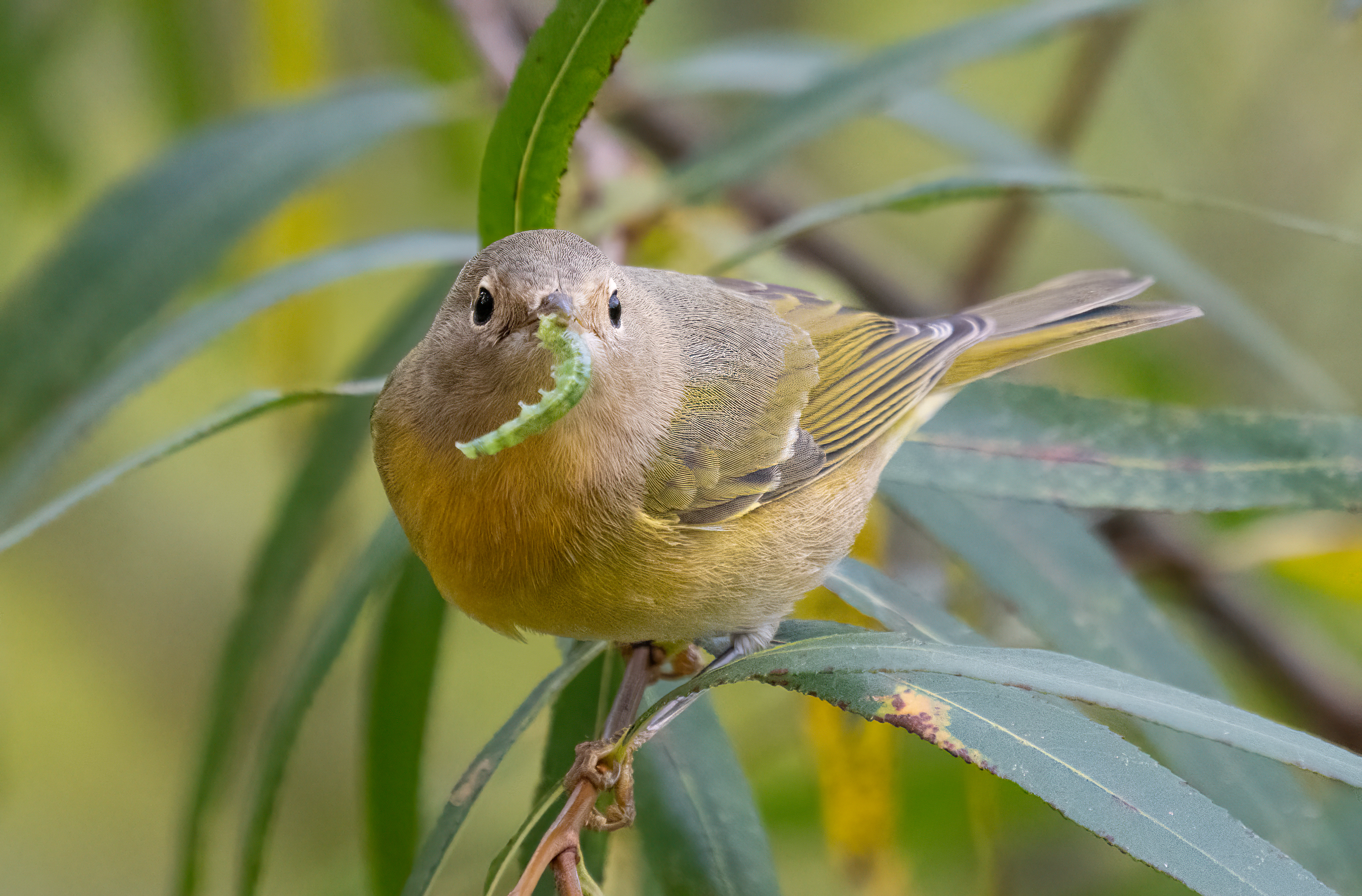
- Female/immature with a caterpillar

Conservation status
- Least Concern (IUCN 3.1)

Scientific classification
- Kingdom: Animalia
- Phylum: Chordata
- Class: Aves
- Order: Passeriformes
- Family: Parulidae
- Genus: Leiothlypis
- Species: L. ruficapilla

Binomial name
- Leiothlypis ruficapilla (Wilson, 1811)
- Breeding range Winter range

Synonyms
- Sylvia ruficapilla Wilson, 1811; Vermivora ridgwayi van Rossem, 1929; Helminthophila rubricapilla Vermivora rubricapilla Vermivora ruficapilla (Wilson, 1811); Oreothlypis ruficapilla (Wilson, 1811) Sangster, 2008

= Nashville warbler =

Species of bird

The Nashville warbler (Leiothlypis ruficapilla) is a small songbird in the New World warbler family, found in North and Central America. It breeds in parts of the northern and western United States and southern Canada, and migrates to winter in southern California and Texas, Mexico, and the north of Central America. It has a gray head and a green back, and its underparts are yellow and white.

== Description ==
The Nashville warbler is a small warbler. Both male and female Nashville warblers have a gray head fading into a greenish back and wings, a white belly and a yellow throat and breast. They have a complete white eye ring, no wing bars, and a thin pointed black bill. Adult males have a rusty brown patch on their crown, which is usually hard to see and often covered by gray feathers. Males will raise it slightly when agitated. Females and immature birds have a duller olive-grey head, and less bold yellow on their throat. The Nashville warbler is closely related to Virginia's warbler, Lucy's warbler, and the Colima warbler, the four sharing generally similar plumage.

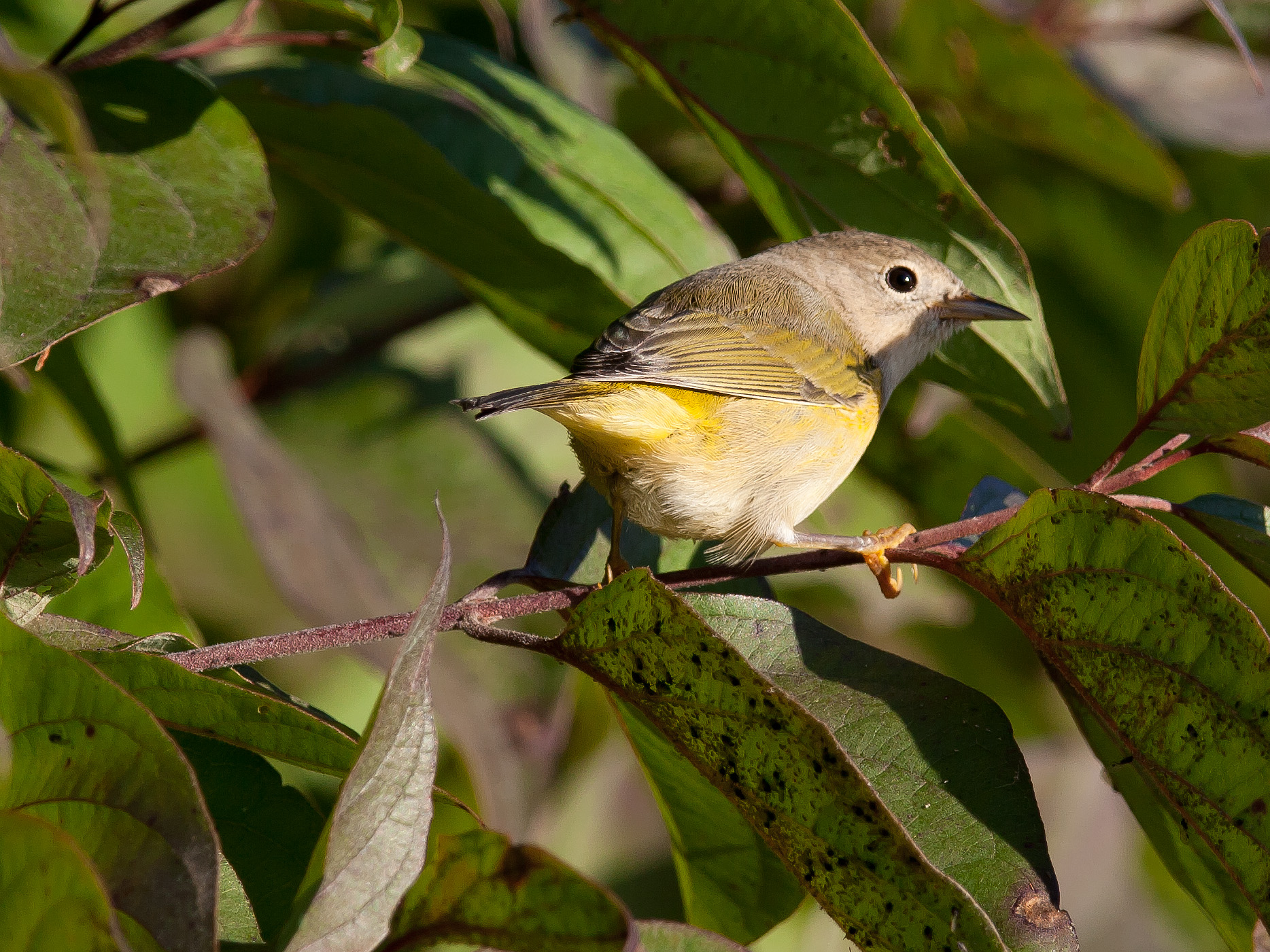
A young female in Madison, Wisconsin

Measurements:

- Length: 4.3–5.1 in (11–13 cm)
- Weight: 0.2–0.5 oz (5.7–14.2 g)
- Wingspan: 6.7–7.9 in (17–20 cm)

== Call ==
Song
The typical song of the Nashville warbler, recorded in St. Louis County, Minnesota

The song of the nominate eastern subspecies consists of a rapid seewit-seewit-seewit-ti-ti-ti. Males sing from open perches on the nesting territory. The call sounds like a high seet. Western birds of the race ridgwayi have a slightly lower-pitched, richer song, and a sharper call note.

== Taxonomy ==
The Nashville warbler was originally described as Sylvia ruficapilla by Alexander Wilson in 1811, using a name which had already been used by John Latham, but not in a valid description according to the International Code of Zoological Nomenclature. Possibly unintentionally, Wilson spelled its name as Sylvia rubricapilla in a later volume in 1812, and this spelling was once commonly used. The genus Sylvia is now restricted to Old World species of the family Sylviidae, unrelated to species such as the Nashville warbler, that are classified in the New World warbler family Parulidae. Until recently, most taxonomies have put this species in the genus Vermivora. However, this species forms a clade with several related species classed in Vermivora, such as the Tennessee warbler and Lucy's warbler, which are more closely related to the flame-throated warbler and crescent-chested warbler than to other species of Vermivora. They were classified in the genus Oreothlypis along with the flame-throated and crescent-chested warblers, although the new genus Leiothlypis was initially proposed for the Nashville warbler and allies, excluding the latter two species.

=== Subspecies ===
There are two recognized subspecies of Nashville warbler, split primarily by geographic range. The two subspecies also have distinct plumage and calls:

- L.r. ruficapilla – nominate eastern subspecies of Nashville warbler. Mantle is olive-green, highly contrasting with gray head, and with a green-yellow ventrum.
- L.r. ridgwayi – western subspecies of Nashville warbler. Also called Calaveras warbler. Mantle is gray-green, lacking high contrast with head, and a yellow ventrum. Frequently bobs tail.

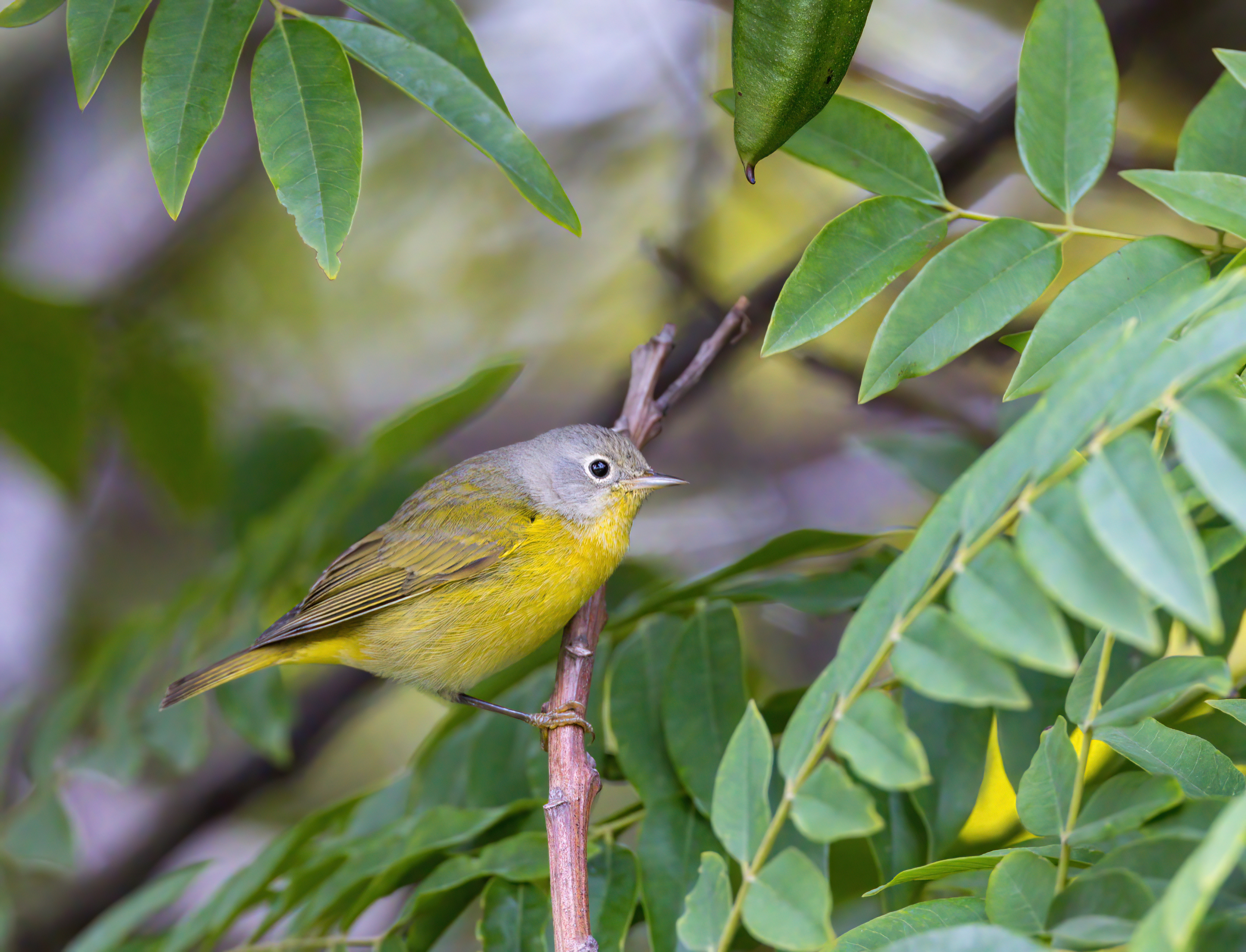
Western subspecies (L.r. ridgwayi) in Santa Barbara, CA

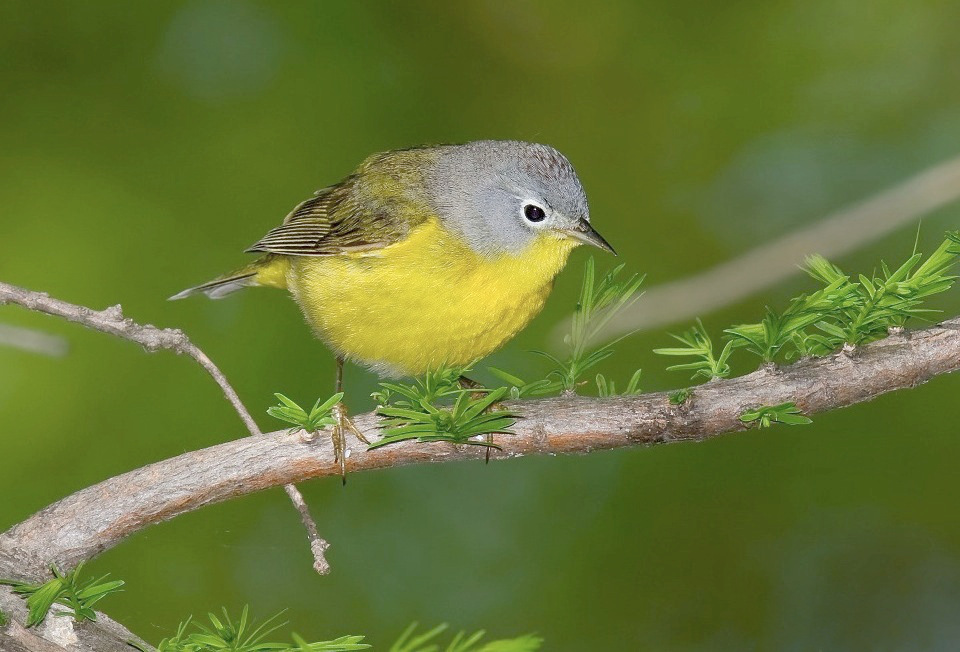
Eastern subspecies (L.r. ruficapilla) in Ohio

== Distribution and habitat ==
Nashville warblers breed in two distinct areas, one in Canada and the northeastern United States, and another in the western United States. The northeastern part of its range extends from Côte-Nord and Cape Breton Island in eastern Canada to central Alberta. For the most part, it only breeds between about 52 and 45.5 degrees north, but it is also found less commonly in the Appalachians of Pennsylvania and West Virginia. Although named after Nashville, Tennessee, the Nashville warbler only visits that area during migration. They migrate to southernmost Texas and California, mid-Mexico, and the northernmost parts of Central America (Guatemala and El Salvador) in winter. In their breeding range, they prefer open mixed woods and bog habitats.

== Behavior ==
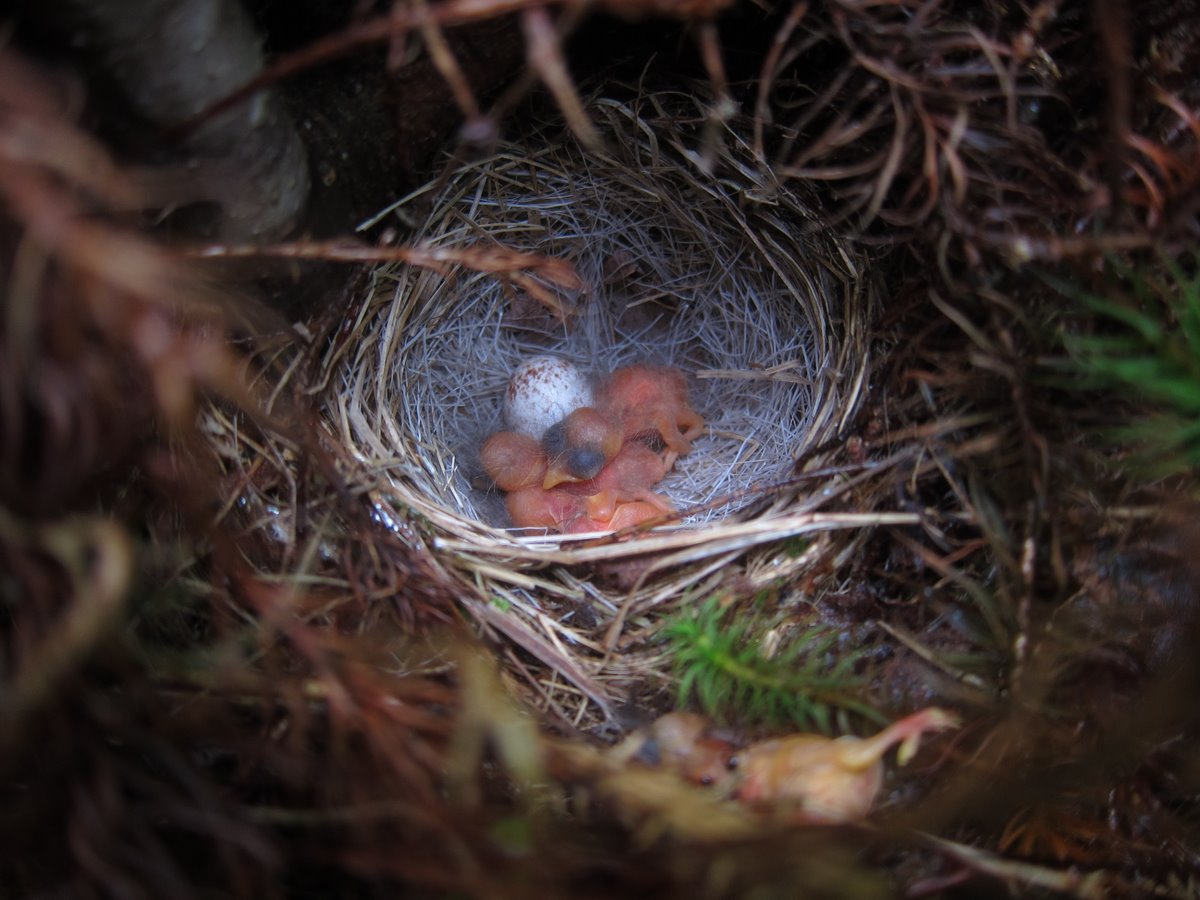
A nest with an egg and newly hatched nestlings, in Bellefeuille, Quebec

Nashville warblers forage by gleaning in the lower parts of trees and shrubs, frequently flicking their tails. In winter, they join together into loose flocks, and sometimes join mixed-species feeding flocks. These birds mainly eat insects, but will supplement this diet with berries and nectar in the winter.

Nashville warblers conceal their nests on the ground under shrubs. Nests are open cups built out of bark strips, leaves, and moss, and are lined with fine materials such as feathers or hairs. Typically, four or five eggs are laid in a clutch, and incubated for 11–12 days. Only the female incubates the eggs, though the male brings her food. On hatching, the young have no feathers apart from some brown down, and their eyes are closed. Juveniles fledge and leave the nest 11 days after hatching.

There is a single record of hybridization with the Tennessee warbler.
