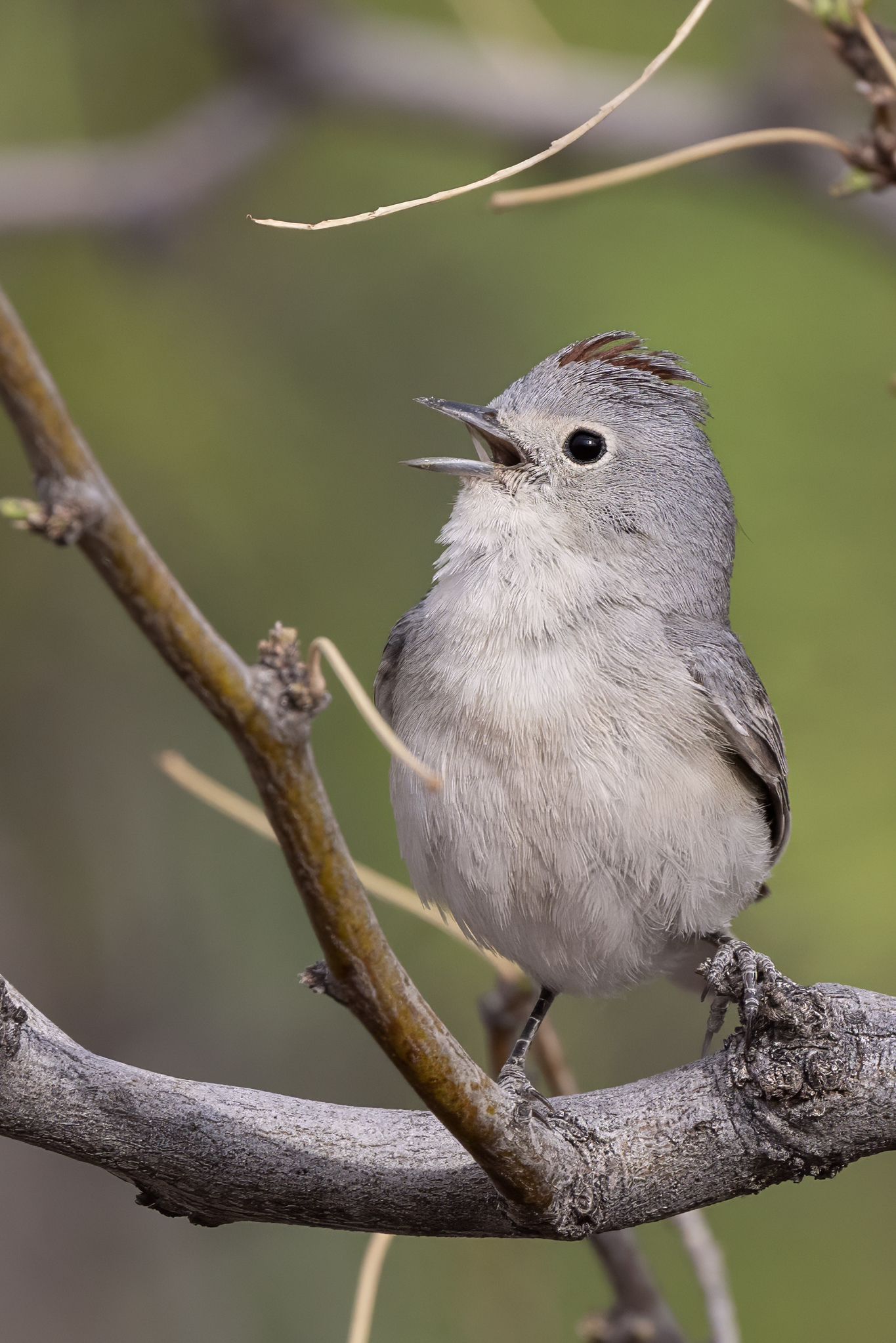
- A Lucy's Warbler singing in Mesilla Valley Bosque State Park, Las Cruces, NM.

Conservation status
- Least Concern (IUCN 3.1)

Scientific classification
- Kingdom: Animalia
- Phylum: Chordata
- Class: Aves
- Order: Passeriformes
- Family: Parulidae
- Genus: Leiothlypis
- Species: L. luciae

Binomial name
- Leiothlypis luciae (Cooper, 1861)
- Range of L. luciae Breeding range Year-round range Winter range

Synonyms
- Vermivora luciae Oreothlypis luciae

= Lucy's warbler =

Species of bird

Lucy's warbler (Leiothlypis luciae) is a small New World warbler found in North America. This species ranges includes southwestern United States and northwestern Mexico. It is one of only two warblers to nest in cavities.

== Description ==
Lucy's warbler is the smallest species of New World warbler. It measures from 9 to 12 cm (3.5 to 4.7 in) in length and can weigh from 5.1 to 7.9 g (0.18 to 0.28 oz), thus being slightly smaller even than the warblers formerly placed in the genus Parula. Among standard measurements, the wing chord is 49 to 61 mm (1.9 to 2.4 in), the tail is 33 to 41 mm (1.3 to 1.6 in), the bill is 7.8 to 9 mm (0.31 to 0.35 in) and the tarsus is 15 to 17.5 mm (0.59 to 0.69 in).

It is rather undistinguished compared to other wood-warblers, being perhaps the palest species in its family. Its head and upperparts are pale gray, while the underparts are whitish. It has a white eyering and a small, pointed bill. Both genders have a rufous rump, a diagnostic field mark. Adult males also have a small rusty patch on their crown. Juveniles are paler, with a tawny rump and buffy wingbars.

Lucy's warbler is closely related to Virginia's warbler, Nashville warbler and Colima warbler. The common name and binomial of this species commemorate Lucy Hunter Baird, daughter of ornithologist Spencer Fullerton Baird.

Lucy's warblers inhabit riparian mesquite and brushy country of the southwestern United States and northwestern Mexico. It can nest in the driest vegetated stretches of the Sonora Desert and nest in possibly the driest habitats of any New World warbler.

== Life history ==
Lucy's is the only warbler besides prothonotary to nest in cavities. It uses natural cavities in cactus or trees or holes excavated by woodpeckers or verdin in prior years. Lucy's warbler has been known to utilize man-made nest boxes, even using a hollowed-out gourd. If using a woodpecker hole, the warbler may fill the cavity almost entirely with debris and put the nest on top so the small birds can see outside of it. This species nests in some of the densest aggregations of any warbler, with as many as 12 pairs per ha (5 pairs per acre). The birds migrate to western Mexico in winter.

These strictly insectivorous birds forage actively, looking for the caterpillars, beetles, and leafhoppers that compose much of their diet. When they capture a caterpillar, they shake it vigorously and skin off the prickly hairs on the back before consumption.

Habitat loss is the main threat to this species, with riparian habitats in its range being developed extensively. To a lesser extent, brown-headed cowbird parasitism is also threatening this species. Populations are diminishing throughout its breeding range.
