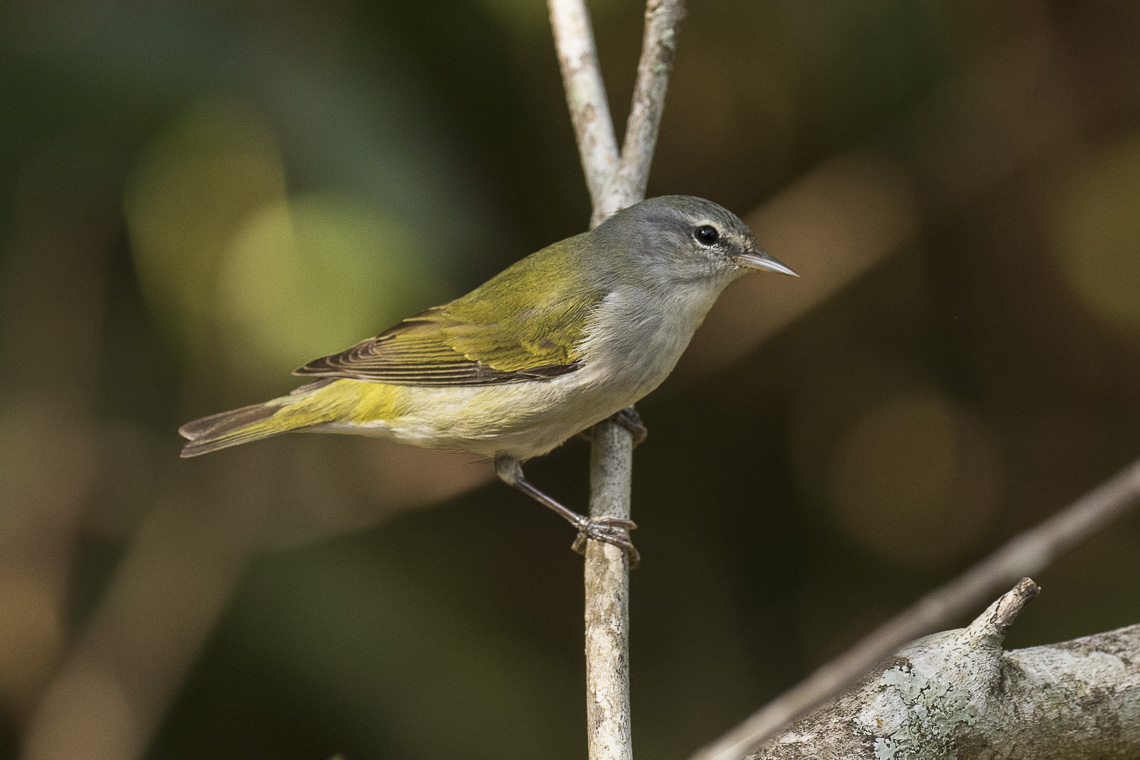
- Tennessee warbler (Leiothlypis peregrina)

Scientific classification
- Kingdom: Animalia
- Phylum: Chordata
- Class: Aves
- Order: Passeriformes
- Family: Parulidae
- Genus: Leiothlypis; Sangster, 2008

Type species
- Sylvia peregrina A. Wilson, 1811

Species
- See text.

Synonyms
- Oreothlypis Ridgway, 1884'

= Leiothlypis =

Genus of birds

Leiothlypis is a genus of New World warbler, formerly classified within the genus Oreothlypis or Vermivora.

The genus was introduced by the Dutch ornithologist George Sangster in 2008 with the Tennessee warbler (Leiothlypis peregrina) as the type species. The genus name is derived from the Ancient Greek λειος/leios meaning "plain" and θλυπις/thlupis, an unknown small bird mentioned by Aristotle.

Although in 2009 the genus was rejected by the American Ornithological Society's Committee on Classification and Nomenclature of North and Middle American Birds, it was accepted in their 2019 supplement to the Check-list of North American Birds.

== Species ==
Six species are recognised:

Genus Leiothlypis – Sangster, 2008 – six species
Common name	Scientific name and subspecies	Range	Size and ecology	IUCN status and estimated population
Tennessee warbler	Leiothlypis peregrina (Wilson, A, 1811)	Northern Canada and northeastern United States to Central America and northern South America.	Size: Habitat: Diet:	LC
Orange-crowned warbler	Leiothlypis celata (Say, 1822) Four subspecies: L. c. celata (Say, 1822); L. c. lutescens (Ridgway, 1872); L. c. orestera (Oberholser, 1905); L. c. sordida (Townsend, CH, 1890)	Canada and Alaska south to Central America.	Size: Habitat: Diet:	LC
Colima warbler	Leiothlypis crissalis (Salvin & Godman, 1889)	Sierra Madre Occidental and Oriental of central Mexico, into adjacent southwestern Texas in the Chisos Mountains of Big Bend National Park.	Size: Habitat: Diet:	LC
Lucy's warbler	Leiothlypis luciae (Cooper, 1861)	southwestern United States and northwestern Mexico.	Size: Habitat: Diet:	LC
Nashville warbler	Leiothlypis ruficapilla (Wilson, 1811)	North and Central America	Size: Habitat: Diet:	LC
Virginia's warbler	Leiothlypis virginiae (Baird, 1860)	southern mountains of Colorado, central Wyoming, and central and western New Mexico.	Size: Habitat: Diet:	LC
