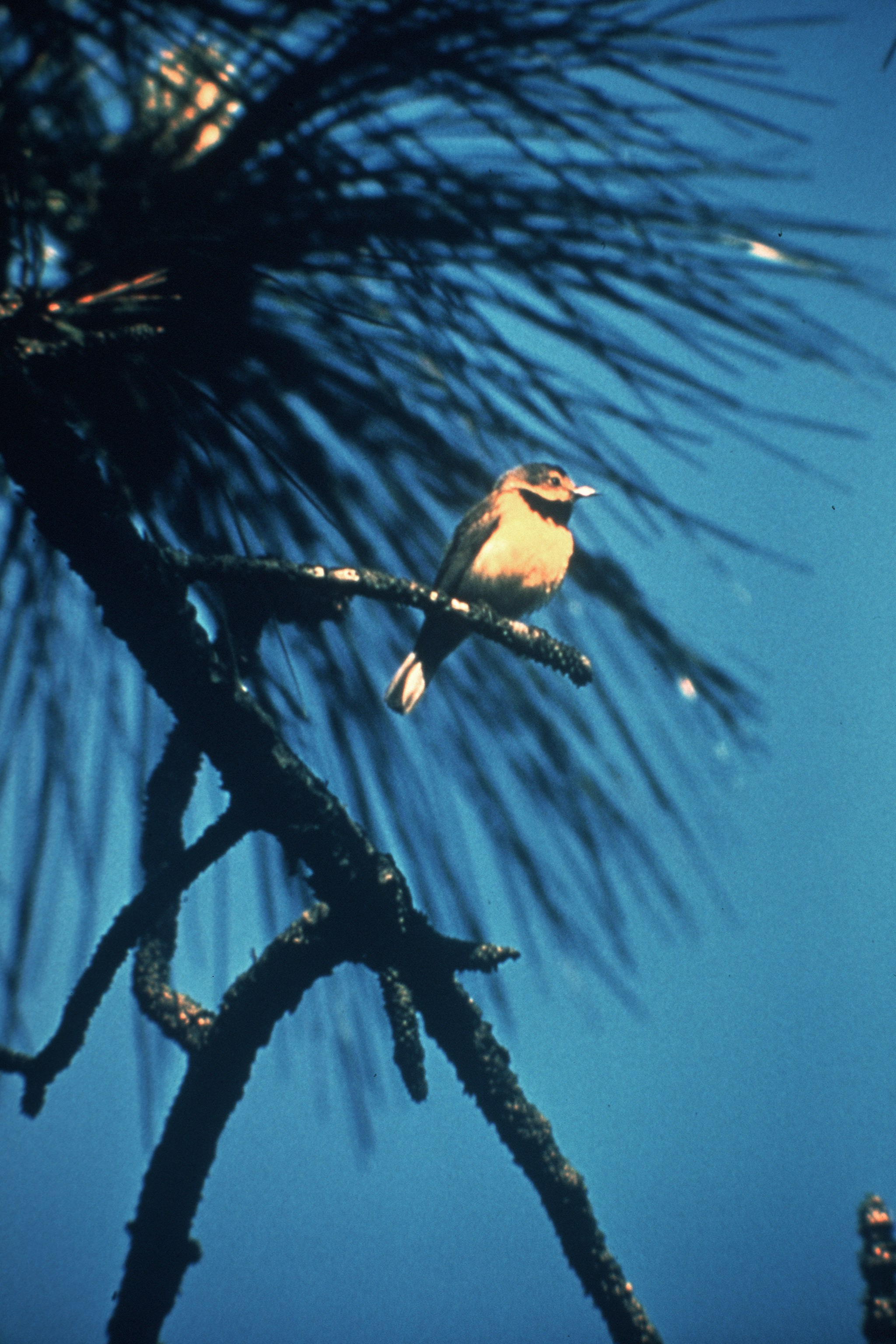
- Live bird photographed by Jerry A. Payne in 1958

Conservation status
- Critically endangered, possibly extinct (IUCN 3.1)

- Presumed Extinct (NatureServe)

Scientific classification
- Kingdom: Animalia
- Phylum: Chordata
- Class: Aves
- Order: Passeriformes
- Family: Parulidae
- Genus: Vermivora
- Species: V. bachmanii

Binomial name
- Vermivora bachmanii (Audubon, 1833)
- Former range of V. bachmanii Breeding range Winter range

= Bachman's warbler =

Extinct bird species

Bachman's warbler (Vermivora bachmanii) is an extinct passerine migratory bird. This warbler was a migrant, breeding in swampy blackberry and cane thickets of the Southeastern and Midwestern United States and wintering in Cuba. There are some reports of the bird from the twenty-first century, but none are widely accepted. Some authorities accept a Louisiana sighting in August 1988 as confirmed, but the last uncontroversial sightings date to the 1960s.

== Taxonomy ==
This bird was first recorded in 1832 by the Reverend John Bachman, who found the species near Charleston, South Carolina, and presented study skins and descriptions to his friend and collaborator, John James Audubon. Audubon never saw the bird alive but named it in honor of Bachman in 1833. An alternate common name of the species used by some 19th-century authors, paralleling similar names given to other species once placed in the genus Helinaia, is Bachman's swamp warbler.

The blue-winged and rapidly declining golden-winged warblers, also members of the genus Vermivora, are thought to be this warbler's closest relatives. There are no known subspecies.

== Description ==
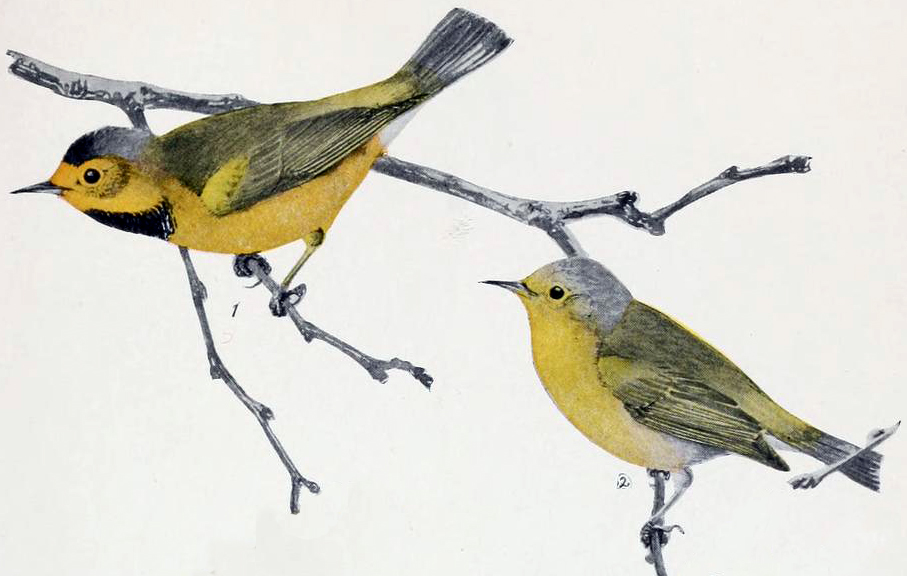
Male (above) and female, by Louis Agassiz Fuertes

Bachman's warbler was a sexually dimorphic species and the adults had two distinct plumages, one in the spring and one in the fall. In the spring, adult males had a yellow forehead and supercilium. The area below the bird's eye was yellow and the lores a dusky olive. The bird's forecrown was black with gray at the edges, while the rear crown and nape an olive-gray. The rest of the warbler's upperparts were an olive green, with the rump being the brightest. The chin and upper throat were yellow, while the center throat and upper chest were black. The belly was yellow and the undertail coverts white. Males in their first spring were nearly identical to the adult male, but had less black on their crown and chest.

During the spring, adult females were a light yellow in their forehead and supraloral, blending into a gray crown and nape. Its lores were a gray-olive and it had a white eye ring. The rest of the female's upperparts were an olive-green, which like the male was brightest on the rump. The chin and throat were also a light yellow and the sides of the neck and the upper breast were gray. Older females had a few black upper breast feathers. The rest of the breast and the belly was light yellow, blending into white on the undertail coverts. The flanks were washed with gray. First spring females resembled the adult female, but appeared duller.

Bachman's warbler molted over the summer into its fall plumage. For adult males, the fall plumage was nearly identical to the spring, with the only difference being that the forecrown changed from black to gray. First year males also resembled their spring plumage, but had an olive forecrown and duller yellow underparts. Adult females possessed the same plumage, though fresher in the fall, while first year females had an olive-yellow forehead and a dull eyering.

Hatchlings obtained their first plumage in May and underwent their first molt in June. Juvenile Bachman's warblers had a dusky brown head and upperparts and were a paler brown below, which transitioned to dull white on the lower body and undertail.

This warbler was 4.25 inches (10.8 cm) in length. It was relatively small for a warbler and had a short tail. It was unique amongst warblers for its thin and decurved bill. The Bachman's warbler's bill was blackish brown in adults and brown in the juveniles. The legs were a grayish-brown, while the eyes dark brown.

=== Voice ===
Documented examples of the species' songs are composed of a rapid series of six to twenty-five buzz notes, sometimes ending in a sharp, slurred zip note. The song is similar to that of the northern parula, but distinguishable in that it was noticeably monotone. Multiple call notes have been recorded, ranging from a soft tsip to a low, hissing zee-e-eep..

Recordings made by Arthur Allen in Virginia in 1954 and by G. Stuart Keith made in South Carolina in 1959 have been archived in the Cornell Lab of Ornithology's Macaulay Library and the University of Ohio's Borror Laboratory of Bioacoustics. The Macaulay Library compiled selections from both sets of recordings as ML10718.

== Distribution and habitat ==
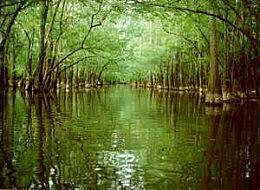
Congaree National Park was searched for the species in 2002, without success.

Bachman's warbler bred primarily in two distinct regions, namely the southern Atlantic coastal plain and the Gulf Coast states north along the Mississippi River watershed to Kentucky. In the southern Atlantic coastal plain, the bird bred in South Carolina near Charleston, though it is believed to have once bred as far north as Virginia and south into Georgia. The Gulf Coast breeding habitat is located primarily in central Alabama, though reports from northern Mississippi and Louisiana are known. It bred north of Alabama along Arkansas's and Missouri's St. Francis River. Unaccepted records of breeding in eastern Texas, Oklahoma, and Tennessee are known. During migration, the species was primarily recorded in Florida and the Florida Keys, although a few birds migrated along the eastern Gulf Coast. Additionally, there is one spring migration record from the Bahamas in 1901. The species primarily wintered in Cuba. It was recorded wintering on Isla de la Juventud, and one wintering record is known from Florida. Unconfirmed reports of the species wintering in Georgia's Okefenokee Swamp exist.

Bachman's warbler bred in timbered bottomland swamps with pools of still water. These swampy forests are mainly composed of deciduous trees such as cypress, sweet gum, dogwood, red oak, hickory, black gum, and tupelo. While it is not definitively known what microhabitat in these swamps Bachman's warblers preferred, it is believed that they preferred small edges created by fire or storms with a dense understory of the cane species Arundinaria gigantea and palmettos. Some believe that this species may have been a cane specialist.

While migrating, the species preferred bottomland forests, though it was reported in scrubby habitats as well. During the Cuban winter it may have broadened its habitat to include most forests, ranging from dry, semideciduous forests to urban parks to swamps. Hibiscus forests may be important to wintering warblers.

== Ecology and behavior ==
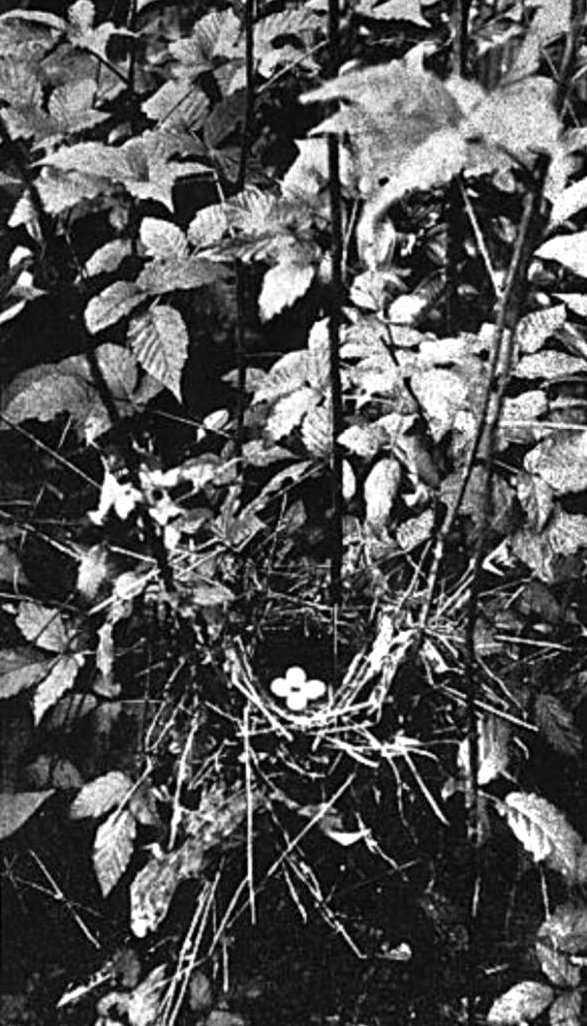
Nest photographed in 1920

Due to the rarity of this species, little is known of its behavior. A lack of detailed field research has likewise resulted in Bachman's warbler being a poorly understood species.

This species did not frequently pump its tail. When alarmed, a Bachman's warbler would jerk its tail and raise its crown feathers.

The species did not frequently sing while migrating. Once it reached its breeding grounds, the warbler preferred to sing from high perches. The female warbler incubated eggs while the male looks for food.

This species's foraging niche was low in elevation, between 3 and 10 ft (0.91 and 3.05 m). However, during migration it was also observed foraging in the tops of trees. This warbler could feed while hanging upside down to probe the bottoms of leaves. Bachman's warbler also fed by gleaning and probing into leaf clusters. The latter foraging strategy led some to hypothesize that Bachman's warbler specialized in foraging among dead leaves in canebrakes. Its primary prey included caterpillars, spiders, and other arthropods. It may have fed on nectar in Cuba, but this hypothesis is unproven.

It may have been a colonial breeder. The nests were deep and bulky. Dead leaves, mosses, grasses, and weed stalks composed the exterior of the nest, while the interior cup was lined with fine fibers from Ramalina lichen and Spanish moss. These nests were made amongst blackberry brambles, cane stalks, and palmettos in bottomland forests 1 and 4 ft (0.30 and 1.22 m) above the ground or, frequently, pools of water. Unusually for a warbler, its eggs were pure white with occasional fine marks at the large end.

=== Migration ===
Bachman's warblers migrated quite early in comparison with other New World warblers. Spring migration began in late February and birds appeared in south Florida and southeastern Louisiana by the first week of March. Peak migration in south Florida was during the first three weeks of March and along the northwestern Florida coast during the third and fourth week of March. The latest recorded Bachman's warbler in Florida was noted on April 9. These warblers reached their South Carolina breeding grounds around mid-March, though some were known to arrive in late February. Birds migrating to southeastern Missouri arrived between mid and late April.

In South Carolina, all Bachman's warblers left their breeding ground by July 19. The peak of fall migration was poorly documented, but the earliest date for a migrant in southern Mississippi was July 4, while the first migrants at Key West were reported on July 17. All migration was between the end of July and August 25, with the last reported migrating individual being a September 24 bird in coastal Georgia.

== Conservation ==
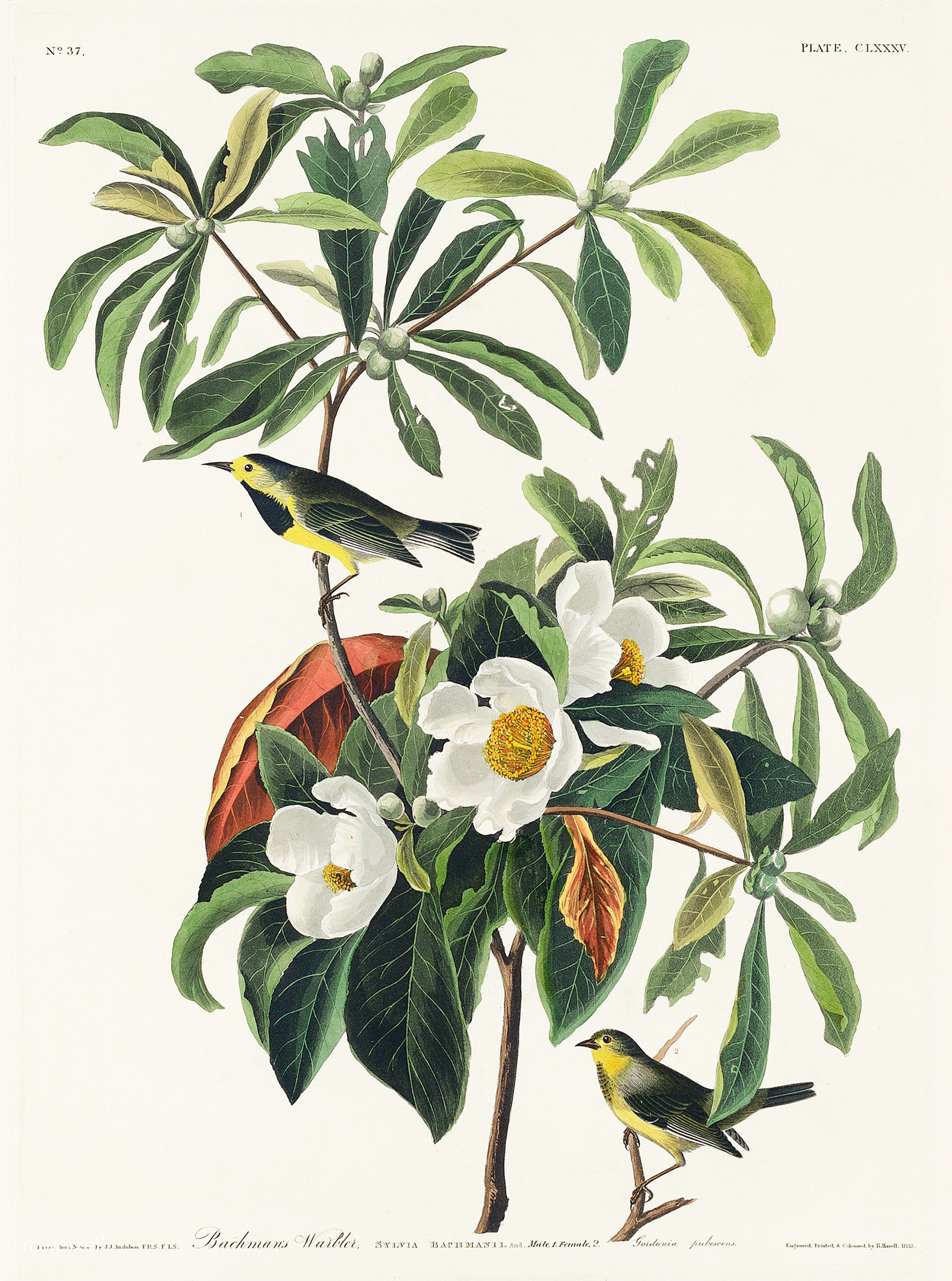
From The Birds of America (1827) by John James Audubon, etched by Robert Havell

Bachman's warbler was originally collected by John Bachman in South Carolina in 1832 and described by Audubon in 1833 from skins mailed by Bachman. It remained largely unknown until the mid-1880s. It is believed that selective logging in the 1800s briefly benefited the species by providing more habitat. It was frequently seen in its breeding habitat from the mid-1880s to 1910. However, when clear-cutting began replacing selective logging, sightings of this species grew scarce. By the 1930s, sightings were rare, and in 1940 the last definite winter sighting was recorded. The last male specimen was collected on March 21, 1941, on Deer Island, Mississippi, while the last female specimen was collected on February 28, 1940, on Ship Island, Mississippi.

Reports of birds from the Missouri and Arkansas breeding grounds lasted through the 1940s, while birds were reported breeding in South Carolina's I'on Swamp until 1953. Individuals were reported from Fairfax County, Virginia, in 1954 and 1958, and a male was seen singing near I'on Swamp in April 1962. On March 30, 1977, an immature female was potentially seen in Brevard County, Florida. The last confirmed observation was in Louisiana in 1988, though it remains controversial. Reports of sightings of the species from Congaree National Park in the early 2000s prompted a formal investigation, but were eventually attributed to misidentifications of hooded warbler sightings and northern parula songs. A thorough and systematic search using playback of recorded Bachman's warbler songs did not reveal any territorial males and did not provoke any aggressive response from other bird species, and the survey leaders concluded the species was not present in the park during their search.

The main factor contributing to the species' decline was habitat destruction. It is thought to have nested in canebrakes, the loss of which threatened the species' survival, as did the loss of wintering habitat in the Caribbean and plume hunting. Small-scale logging in the 1800s may actually have increased the Bachman warbler's breeding habitat. Clearcutting of its habitat and the draining of swamps via water channels are the two main causes of its habitat destruction. While it is unknown whether habitat change in its wintering grounds of Cuba affected the species, it is believed that a winter hurricane in 1932 could have dealt the species a crippling blow, making them too rare to find each other and mate on their breeding grounds. The United States Fish and Wildlife Service proposed on Sept. 29, 2021 to declare the species extinct following a lack of evidence of its survival; the species was delisted and declared extinct in October 2023 in accordance with the Endangered Species Act.

== In culture ==
John James Audubon's folio renderings of a male and female Bachman's warbler were painted on top of an illustration of the Franklinia tree first painted by Maria Martin, John Bachman's sister-in-law and one of the country's first female natural history illustrators.

In the comic strip Doonesbury, Dick Davenport, a bird watcher, died in 1986 of a massive coronary while observing and photographing this species, therefore proving its continued existence. This death scene has been noted as a particularly memorable one in the history of comics.

The novel The Last Warbler, by Carl Bendorf, published November 15, 2026, is a fictionalized account of two birders searching for Bachman's Warbler in the late 70s.
