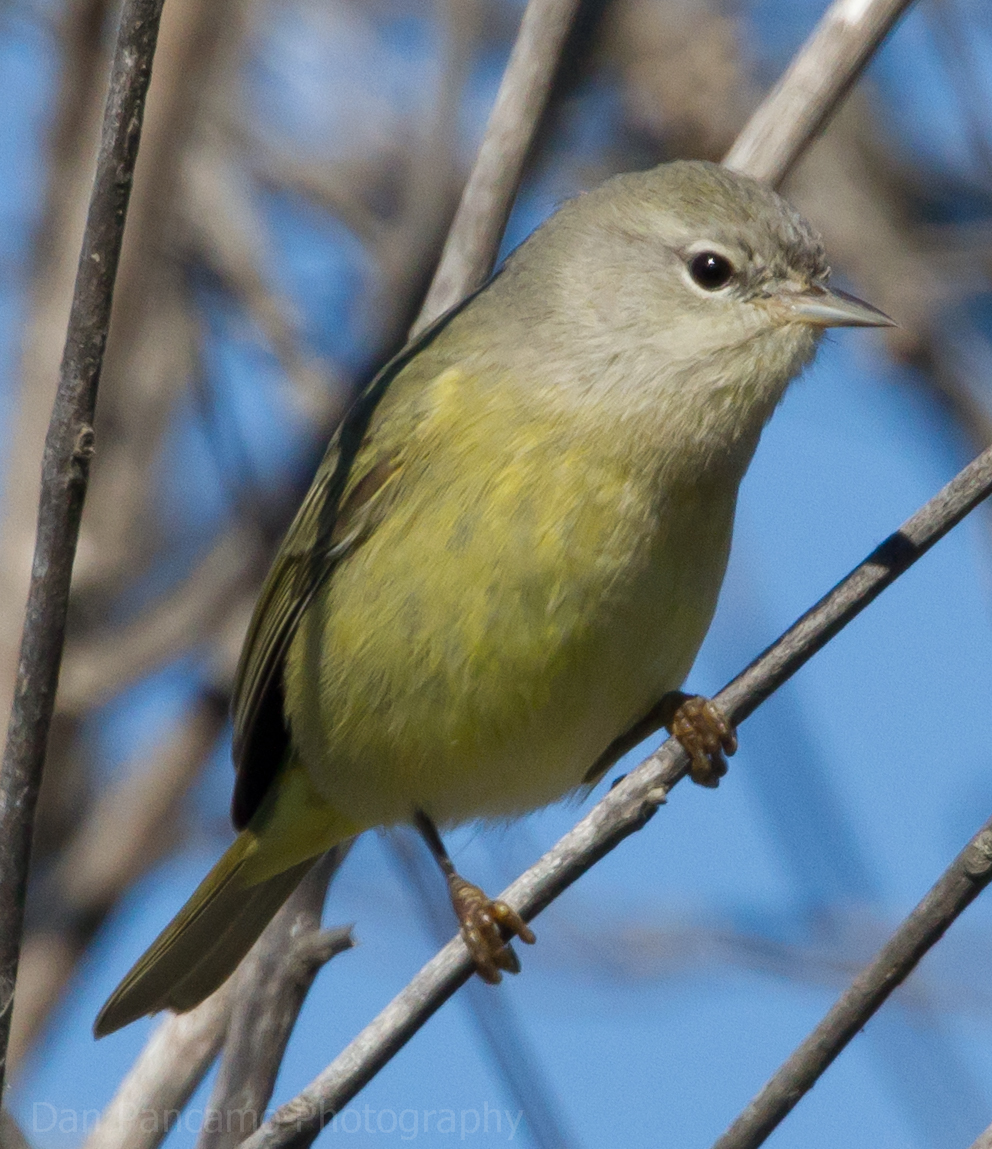

Conservation status
- Least Concern (IUCN 3.1)

Scientific classification
- Kingdom: Animalia
- Phylum: Chordata
- Class: Aves
- Order: Passeriformes
- Family: Parulidae
- Genus: Leiothlypis
- Species: L. celata

Binomial name
- Leiothlypis celata (Say, 1822)
- Range of L. celata Breeding range Year-round range Wintering range

Synonyms
- Helmintophila celata Vermivora celata Oreothlypis celata

= Orange-crowned warbler =

Species of bird

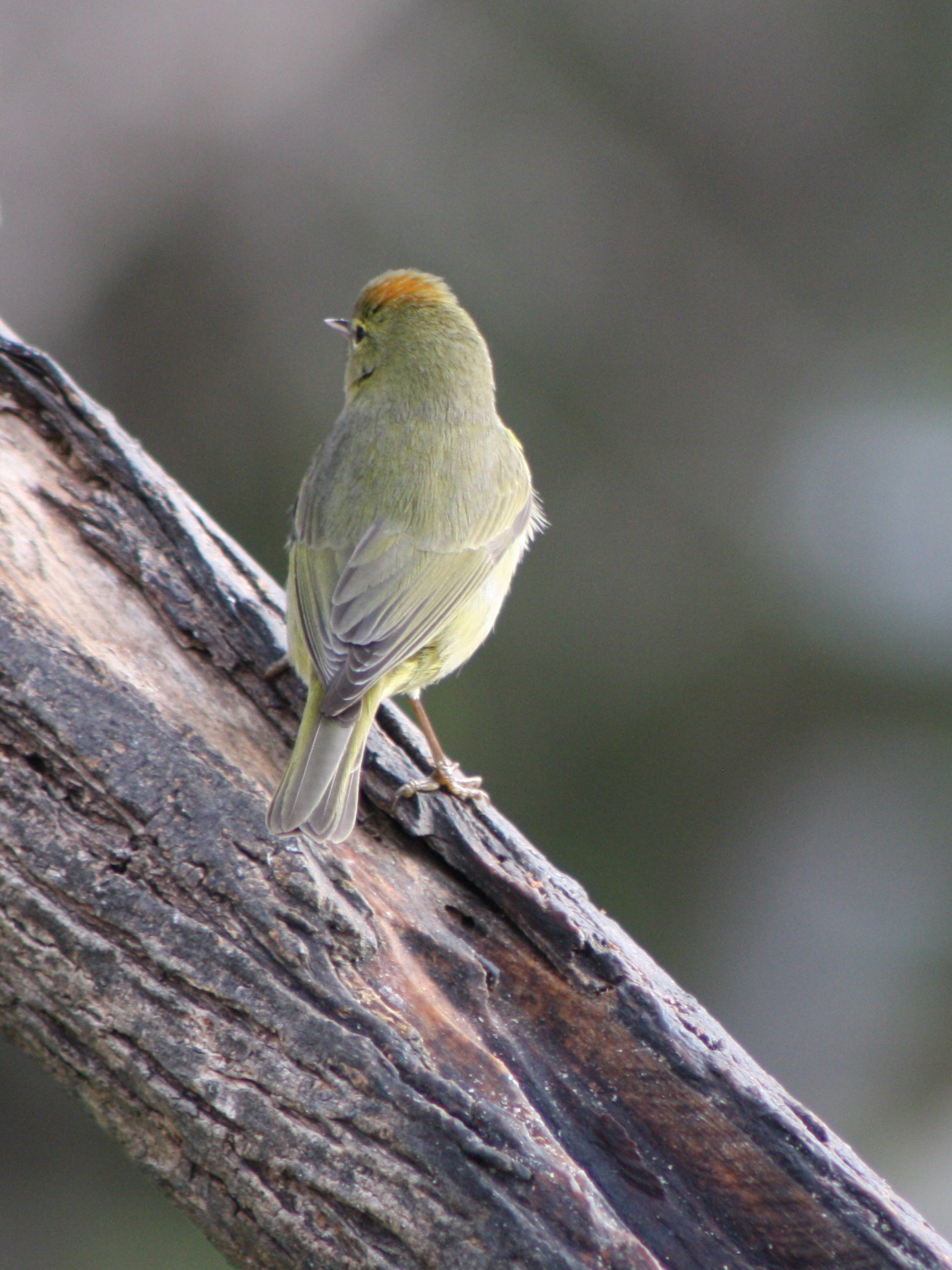
Crown patch visible

The orange-crowned warbler (Leiothlypis celata) is a small songbird of the New World warbler family.

== Taxonomy ==
The orange-crowned warbler was formally described in 1822 by the American zoologist Thomas Say under the binomial name Sylvia celatus from a specimen collected on an expedition from Pittsburgh to the Rocky Mountains led by Stephen Harriman Long. The specific epithet celatus is Latin and means "secret" or "hidden". The type locality is Omaha, Nebraska. The orange-crowned warbler is now placed in the genus Leiothlypis that was introduced by the Dutch ornithologist George Sangster in 2008. The genus name is derived from the Ancient Greek λειος/leios meaning "plain" and θλυπις/thlupis, an unknown small bird mentioned by Aristotle.

Four subspecies are recognised:

- L. c. celata (Say, 1822) – breeds in central Alaska to south Canada, winters in Guatemala
- L. c. lutescens (Ridgway, 1872) – breeds in west Canada and west USA, winters in Guatemala
- L. c. orestera (Oberholser, 1905) – breeds in west central Canada and west central USA, winters in Mexico
- L. c. sordida (Townsend, CH, 1890) – resident in south California (southwest USA) and northwest Mexico

== Description ==
The orange-crowned warbler has olive-grey upperparts, yellowish underparts with faint streaking and a thin pointed bill. It has a faint line over each eye and a faint broken eye ring. The orange patch on the crown is usually not visible. Females and immatures are duller in colour than males. Western birds are yellower than eastern birds. Orange-crowned warblers are distinguished by their lack of wing bars, streaking on the underparts, strong face marking or bright colouring, resembling a fall Tennessee warbler and a black-throated blue warbler, both of which are also members of the New World warbler family.

The song of is a trill, descending in pitch and volume. The call is a high chip.

Standard Measurements
length	4.8–5.3 in (120–130 mm)
weight	9 g (0.32 oz)
wingspan	7.25 in (184 mm)
wing	56.9–62.5 mm (2.24–2.46 in)
tail	46–51.5 mm (1.81–2.03 in)
culmen	10–11.2 mm (0.39–0.44 in)
tarsus	16.5–18.5 mm (0.65–0.73 in)

== Distribution and habitat ==
Their breeding habitat is open shrubby areas across Canada, Alaska and the western United States. These birds migrate in the winter to the southern United States and south to Central America. Although they are quite common in the western United States, they are uncommon in the east.

== Behaviour and ecology ==
=== Breeding ===
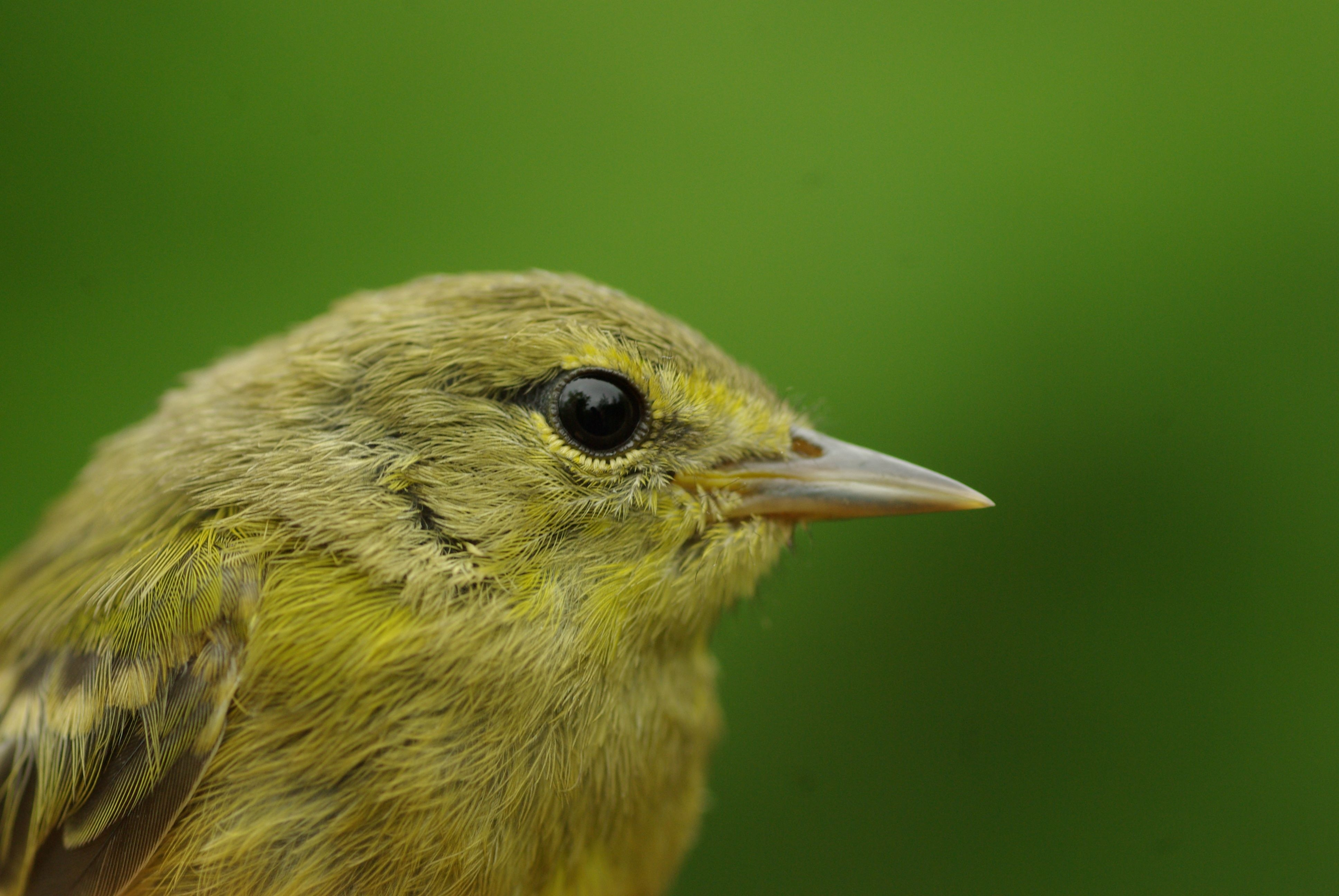
Orange-crowned warbler is one of the species of birds jeopardized by the decline of broadleaf forests in the Pacific Northwest

The nest is a small open cup well-concealed on the ground under vegetation or low in shrubs. The female builds the nest; four to six eggs are laid in a nest on the ground or in a low bush. Both parents feed the young.

=== Food and feeding ===
They forage actively in low shrubs, flying from perch to perch, sometimes hovering. These birds eat insects, berries and nectar.
