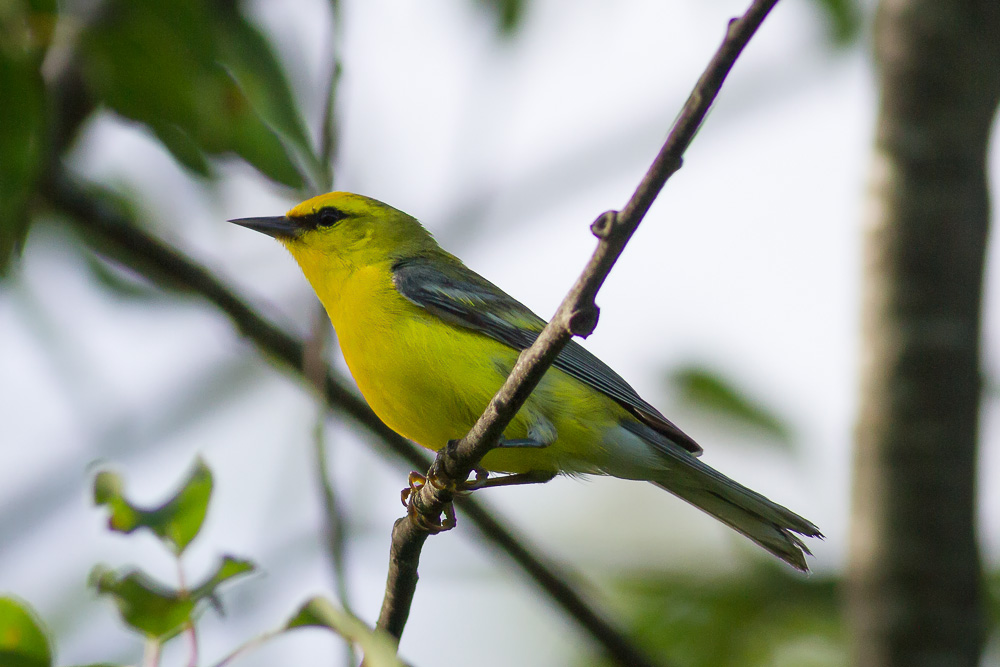
- Adult male in Maine, United States Song

Conservation status
- Least Concern (IUCN 3.1)

Scientific classification
- Kingdom: Animalia
- Phylum: Chordata
- Class: Aves
- Order: Passeriformes
- Family: Parulidae
- Genus: Vermivora
- Species: V. cyanoptera

Binomial name
- Vermivora cyanoptera Olson & Reveal, 2009
- Range of V. cyanoptera Breeding range Winter range

Synonyms
- Vermivora pinus; Helminthophila pinus

= Blue-winged warbler =

Species of bird

The blue-winged warbler (Vermivora cyanoptera) is a fairly common migratory New World warbler, 11.5 cm (4.5 in) long and weighing 8.5 g (0.30 oz). It breeds in eastern North America in southern Ontario and the eastern United States and winters in southern Central America. Its breeding range is extending northwards, where it is replacing the very closely related golden-winged warbler (Vermivora chrysoptera).

== Taxonomy ==
In 1766 the Swedish naturalist Carl Linnaeus described a new species in the twelfth edition of his Systema Naturae under the binomial name Certhia pinus. Linnaeus based his entry on the "pine-creeper" that had been described and illustrated by the English naturalists Mark Catesby in 1731 and George Edwards in 1760. Edwards had doubts as to whether his specimen was the same species as illustrated by Catesby and included as a footnote "On a stricter examination I think it a species different from Catesby's". Edwards' etching actually depicted a blue-winged warbler so that Linnaeus's name applied to both the pine warbler and the blue-winged warbler. In 1810 the American ornithologist Alexander Wilson redescribed the blue-winged warbler under the binomial name Sylvia solitaria. Unfortunately, this name was pre-occupied as it had been used in 1808 by John Lewin for the rockwarbler, now Origma solitaria in the Australian warbler family Acanthizidae. In 2009 Storrs L. Olson and James L. Reveal proposed the replacement name, Vermivora cyanoptera, for the blue-winged warbler. This replacement has been accepted by other ornithologists. The blue-winged warbler is now placed in the genus Vermivora that was introduced in 1827 by the English zoologist William Swainson. The genus name combines Latin vermis meaning "worm" with -vorus meaning "-eating". The species is monotypic: no subspecies are recognised.

The common name blue-winged warbler refers to the bluish-gray color of the wings that contrast with the bright yellow body of the male. The genus formerly included nine other new world warblers but now only includes this species, the golden-winged warbler and Bachman's warbler (Vermivora bachmanii), which is believed to be extinct.

=== Hybridization with golden-winged warbler ===
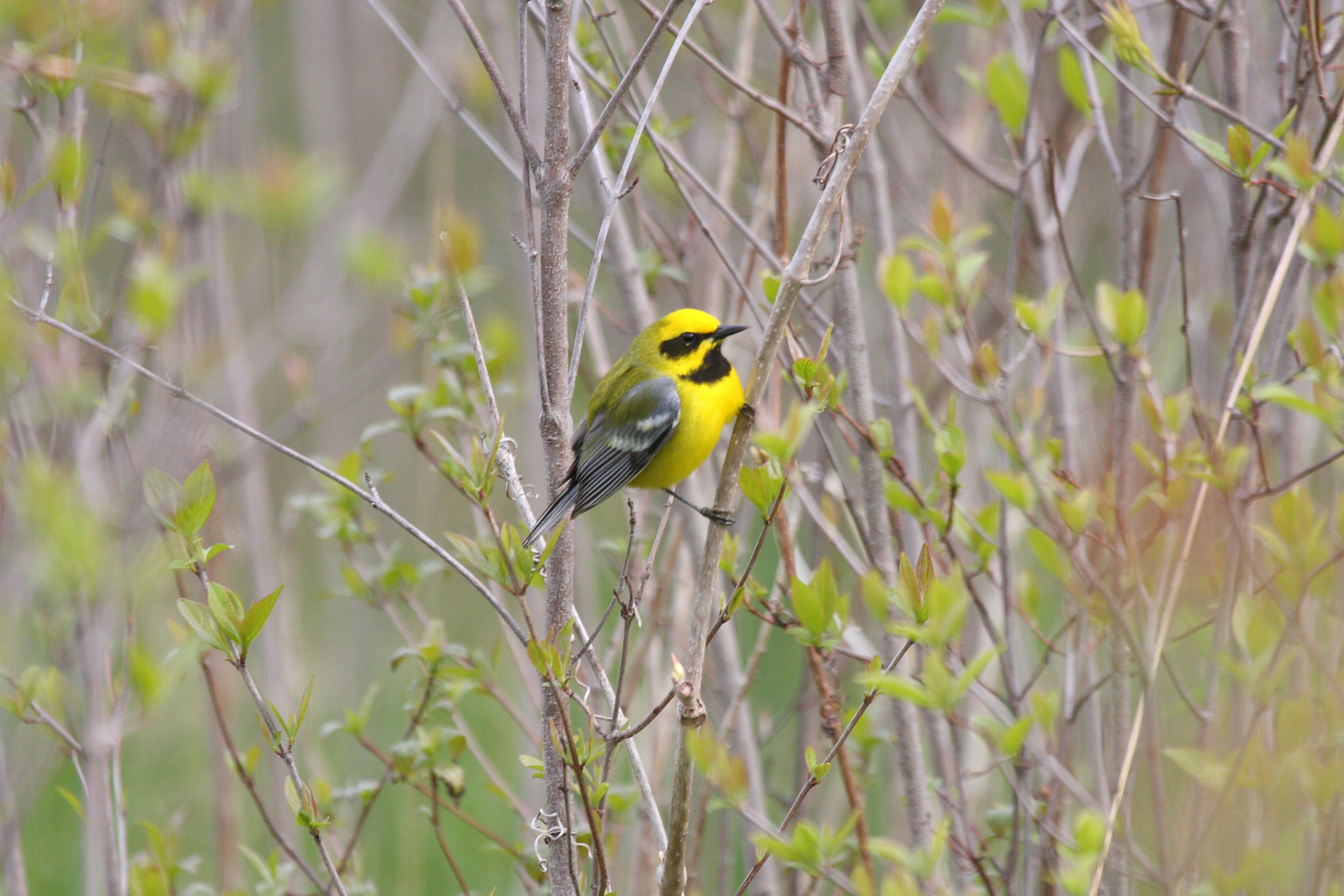
Lawrence's warbler

The blue-winged and golden-winged warblers are often compared to one another. Originally, the blue-winged warbler evolved on the interior of the continent, while the golden-winged species bred closer to the Atlantic coast. However, in recent years their habitats have drastically changed due to urbanization, deforestation, and other factors.

Golden-winged warblers are generally more susceptible to displacement from the blue-winged warblers. One example of this can be seen in the warbler population in central New York state. In the 1980s, the blue-winged warbler significantly increased in the area while the golden-winged warbler's population decline. Because of the trend, it is often assumed that the blue-winged warbler somehow causes the local extinction of the golden-winged warbler; however, molecular studies confirm that the blue-winged warbler and golden-winged warbler are sister species that diverged sometime around 1.5 million years ago. Studies reveal that the two species are genetically 99.97% alike, and that their main differences are their general phenotypic appearances and singing tones.

New studies also explain that the two warblers can coexist in their chosen habitat. The two species can also hybridize freely where their habitats overlap, producing two hybrid types: Lawrence's warbler and Brewster's warbler.

This species forms two distinctive hybrids with the golden-winged warbler where their ranges overlap in the Great Lakes and New England area. The more common and genetically dominant Brewster's warbler is gray above and whitish (male) or yellow (female) below. It has a black eye stripe and two white wing bars. The rarer recessive Lawrence's warbler has a male plumage which is green and yellow above and yellow below, with white wing bars and the same face pattern as male golden-winged. The female is gray above and whitish below with two yellow wing bars and the same face pattern as female golden-winged.

1. Song - The four species have different Song I type patterns, but primarily consist of the A-B pattern, resulting in difficulty distinguishing from one another. Their Song II type are more distinguishable from each other.
2. Morphology - The Brewster's warblers tend to resemble the plumage of the golden-winged but has a blue wing face pattern and variable amounts of yellow. The Lawrence's warblers look similar to blue-winged in terms of the plumage but exhibit a wing pattern similar to the golden-winged.
3. Introgressed genotypes - Studies on the blue-winged and golden-winged warbler hybrids have indicated the presence of cryptic hybridization in the past for this species. This is done through DNA marker types, such as amplified fragment length polymorphisms (AFLPs). This may indicate that there has been repeated backcrossing between the genes in both species and their hybrid offspring.

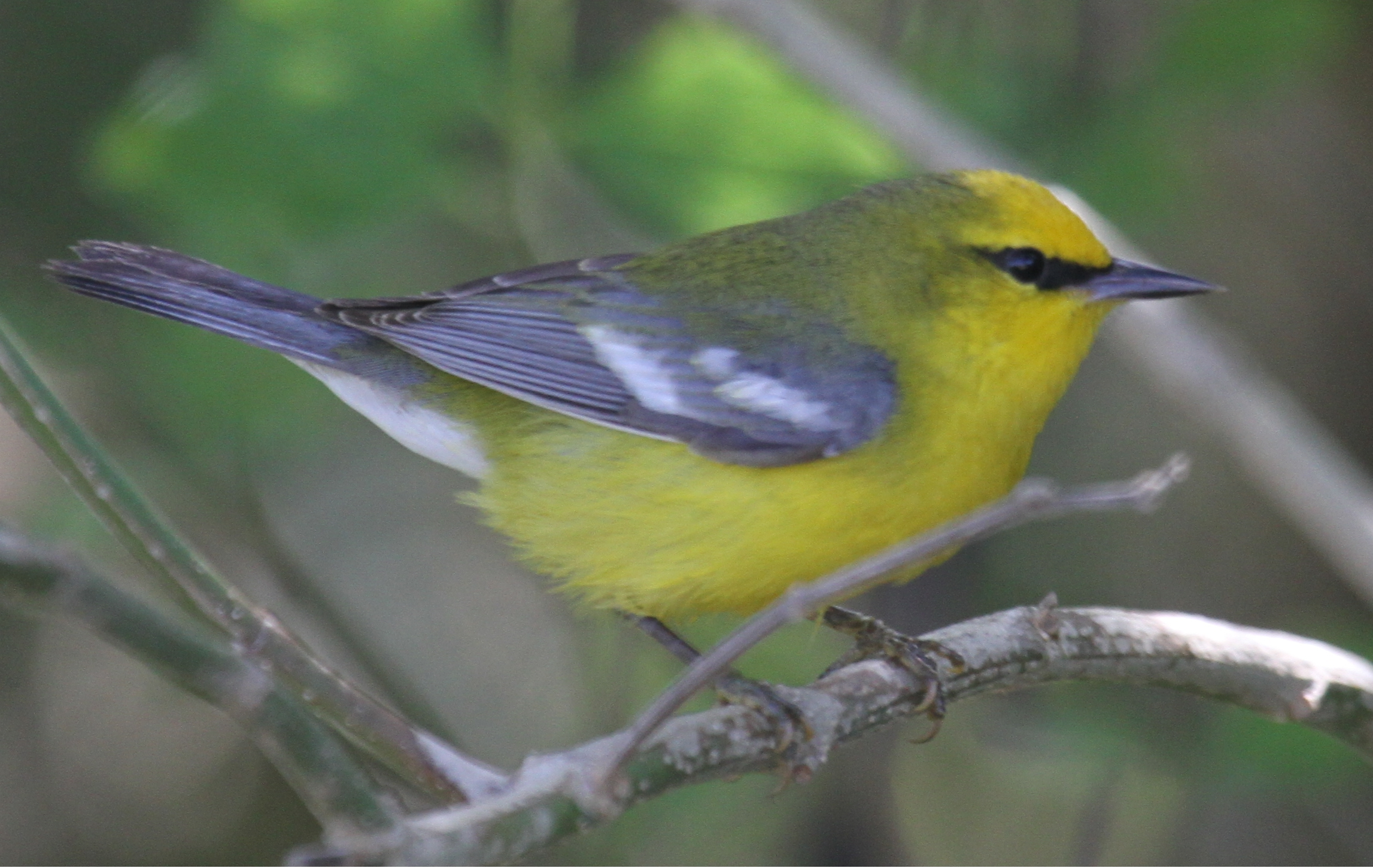
South Padre Island - Texas

== Description ==
The blue-winged warbler is a small warbler at 11.4–12.7 cm (4.5–5.0 in) long, with a wingspan of 17–19.5 cm (6.7–7.7 in). The breeding plumage of the male consists of a bright yellow head, breast and underparts. There is no streaking of the underparts of the bird. It has a narrow black line though the eyes and light blueish gray with two white wing-bars, which are diagnostic field marks. The blue winged warblers are generally small in size with a well-proportioned body, and heavy pointed bill. They roughly measure 4.3 to 4.7 inches long with a wingspan of around 5.9 inches. An average Blue-Winged Warbler weighs around 0.3 oz.

The female is duller overall with less yellow on the crown. Immatures are olive green with wings similar to the adults.

The color of their plumage tends to vary depending on the sex of the species. For males, the feathers are of bright yellow and olive green. The males often have bluish-gray wings that come with white wing bars and a distinctive black eye lining, making their heads look pointier compared to other male warbler species.

Blue-winged warbler females exhibit a yellow plumage that looks a bit lighter in color. The females also have a much less prominent eye lining which mostly looks grey and light, rather than black as seen in the males.

Immature or juvenile blue-winged warblers are smaller compared to adults and will show a pinkish bill and almost invisible wing bars.

The song is a series of buzzing notes. The call is a sharp chip.

== Distribution and habitat ==
Blue-winged warblers are migratory New World warblers. They winter in southern Central America and breed from east-central Nebraska in the west to southern Minnesota, Wisconsin, Michigan and southern Ontario in the north to central New York, southern Vermont, southern New Hampshire and New England to the east, south to western South Carolina, northern Georgia, northern Alabama, eastern Tennessee and southern Missouri. It is a very rare vagrant to western Europe, with one bird wandering to Ireland.

The breeding habitat is open scrubby areas. The species is mostly found in abandoned fields with shrubs and trees and bordered by tall deciduous trees. Blue-winged warblers are generally found in areas located in higher elevation and high percentage of grass and canopy cover.

== Behaviour and ecology ==
=== Food and feeding ===
Diet consists of insects and spiders. Blue-winged warblers primarily feed on insects found in various plants including apple trees, walnut trees, and water hemlock. Adults sometimes hang upside down to glean and probe leaves and gather insect larvae for their young. Some examples of larvae fed to juvenile blue-winged warblers include Aphis sp., and Corythucha sp. Often, researchers presume that the species's diet and feeding methods tend to differ on each season and habitat, and may also change due to the availability of resources. This could be considered a relatively generalist species.

=== Breeding ===
Blue-winged warblers nest on the ground or low in a bush, laying four to seven eggs in a cup nest. The females incubate the eggs for 10–11 days. The young are altricial and fledge in 8–10 days. The blue winged species communicate with others via singing. Hence, they have songs for fighting (descending bee-buzz), nesting, as well as breeding with other blue-winged warblers. During breeding season, the males arrive first in the location and wait for their possible mate. Usually, the females arrive one week after the males. While waiting for their mates, the males sing continuously. Once the females enter, the singing decreases and could possibly change in tune until they find a partner. After mating, the length of their song abruptly decreases.
