= George Sangster (ornithologist) =

Dutch ornithologist

George Sangster is a Dutch ornithologist.

He specialises in taxonomy and has written many articles on this subject for the magazines Dutch Birding, British Birds and other publications.

He is a member of the Dutch, British and European taxonomic committees.
