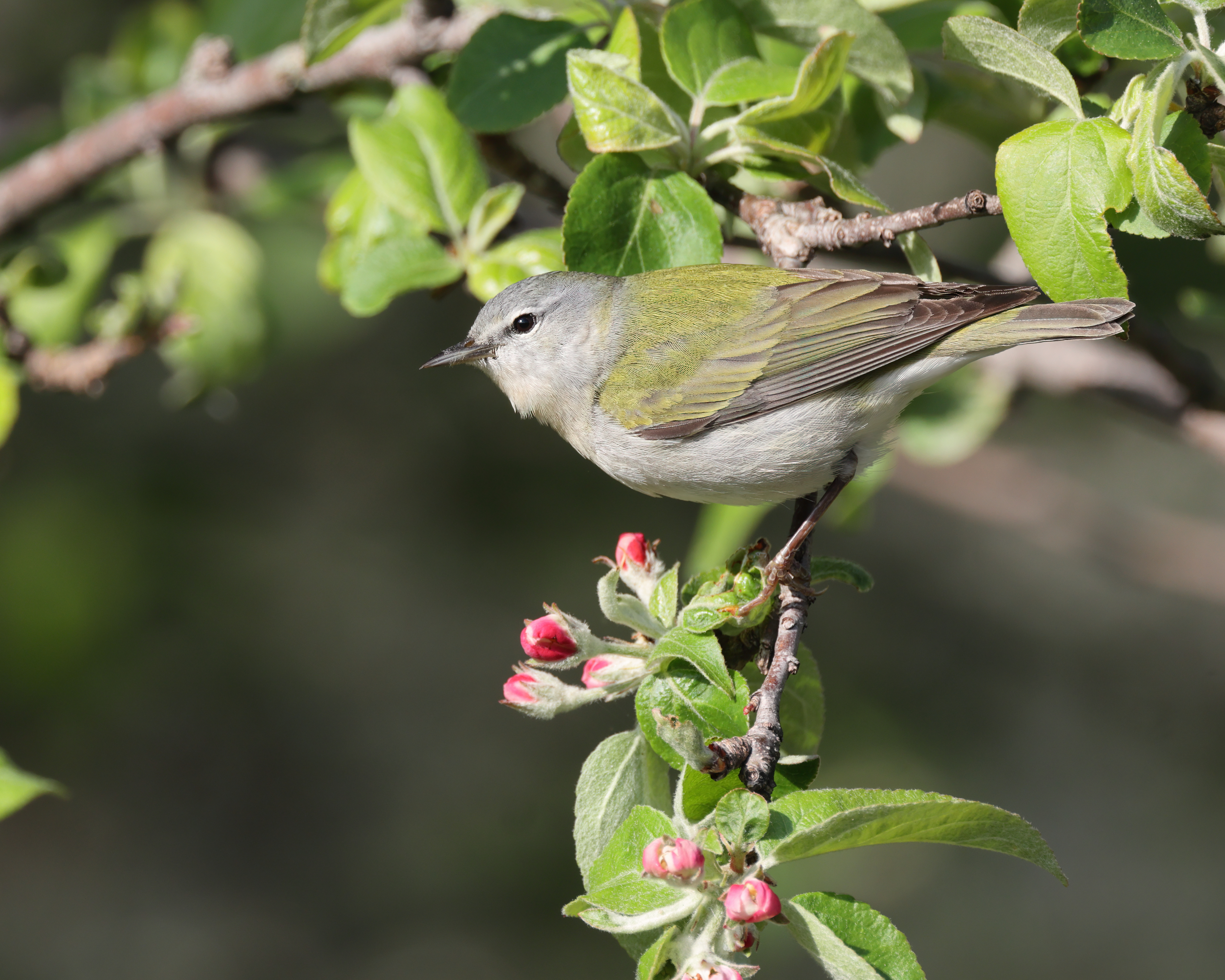
- Foraging in Malus sp. flowers, Roger-Van den Hende botanical garden, Université Laval, Quebec, Canada.

Conservation status
- Least Concern (IUCN 3.1)

Scientific classification
- Kingdom: Animalia
- Phylum: Chordata
- Class: Aves
- Order: Passeriformes
- Family: Parulidae
- Genus: Leiothlypis
- Species: L. peregrina

Binomial name
- Leiothlypis peregrina (Wilson, A, 1811)
- Range of O. peregrina Breeding range Wintering range

Synonyms
- Helmintophila peregrina Oreothlypis peregrina Vermivora peregrina

= Tennessee warbler =

Species of bird

The Tennessee warbler (Leiothlypis peregrina) is a New World warbler that breeds in eastern North America and winters in southern Central America, the Caribbean, and northern South America. The specific name peregrina is from Latin peregrinus "wanderer".

== Description ==
The Tennessee warbler is 11.5 cm (4.5 in) long, has a 19.69 cm (7.75 in) wingspan, and weighs roughly 10 g (0.35 oz). The breeding male has olive back, shoulders, rump and vent. The flight feathers are brownish-black. It has a slate gray neck, crown and eyeline. The underside is a gray-white. The female is similar to the male, but is much duller and is tinged with yellow and olive overall, especially on the underside. The Tennessee warbler has long wings, short tail and a thin, pointy bill. Juveniles and first-year birds are quite similar to the female. In winter and fall, adult male resembles juvenile and spring adult female but shows more yellow below: the grey neck and crown turn into an olive green while the underside takes a yellow hue. On the face the yellow supraocular line stands out. Both sexes have white undertail coverts all year long.

Tennessee warblers resemble female black-throated blue warblers. The only difference is that the black-throated blue has a darker cheek and two white wing spots.

This bird can be confused with the red-eyed vireo, which is larger, moves more deliberately and sings almost constantly. The orange-crowned warbler can also look similar, but lacks the white eyebrow, is greyer-brown above and has yellow undertail coverts.

== Distribution ==
The Tennessee warbler breeds or is resident in the north-eastern and northern Mid-West of the United States and across much of Canada. It is migratory, wintering in southern Central America, the Caribbean, and northern Colombia and Venezuela, with a few stragglers going as far south as Ecuador. It is a very rare vagrant to western Europe. The bird was named by Alexander Wilson, who discovered an individual by Tennessee's Cumberland River in 1832, although this location is outside of the species's usual range.

It breeds from the Adirondack Mountains in New York through northern Vermont, New Hampshire, and Maine north and west throughout much of Canada. It is also found breeding in northeast Minnesota and northern Upper Peninsula of Michigan. This bird was named from a specimen collected in Tennessee, where it may appear during migration.

== Ecology and behavior ==
The Tennessee warbler feeds mainly on insects and prefers the spruce budworm. This species fluctuates in population with the quantity of the budworm. It also likes flower nectar, fruit and some seeds.

This warbler, like most others, is nervous and quick while foraging. It creeps along branches and is found at all levels. It is solitary while nesting, but forms mixed flocks after breeding.

The Tennessee warbler prefers coniferous forests, mixed conifer-deciduous forests, early successional woodlands and boreal bogs. It makes a cup-shaped nest of dried grasses and moss lined with finer grasses, stems and hair. The nest can be placed on the ground or above a bog in moss or in the base of a shrub. The nest is built by the female, and she lays 4–7 white eggs with brown splotches on them.

== Migration ==
In the eastern United States, Tennessee warblers can be very common during migration. They are vagrants to the western United States, especially the Pacific coast.

== Gallery ==
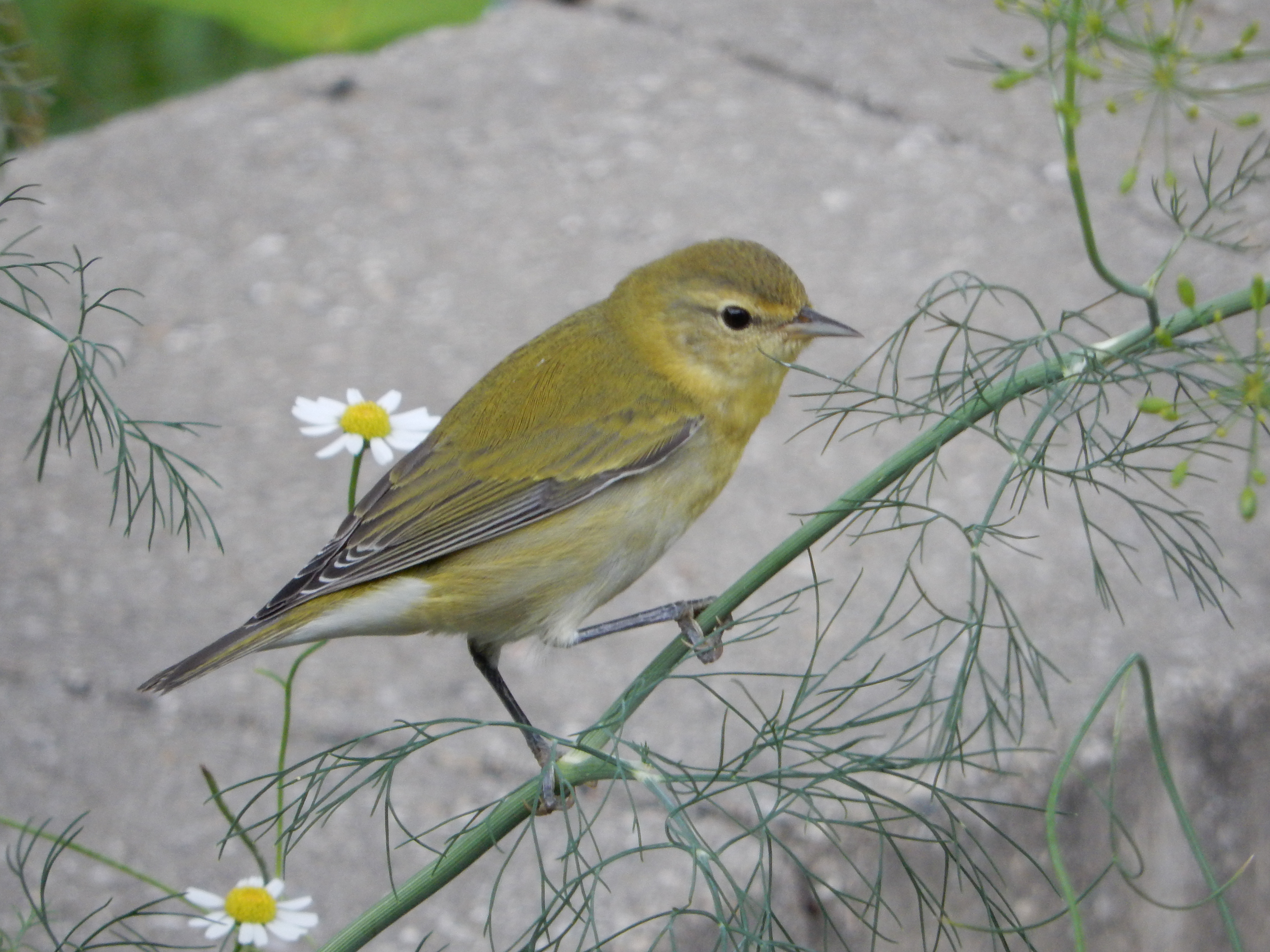
Female during migration in Chicago

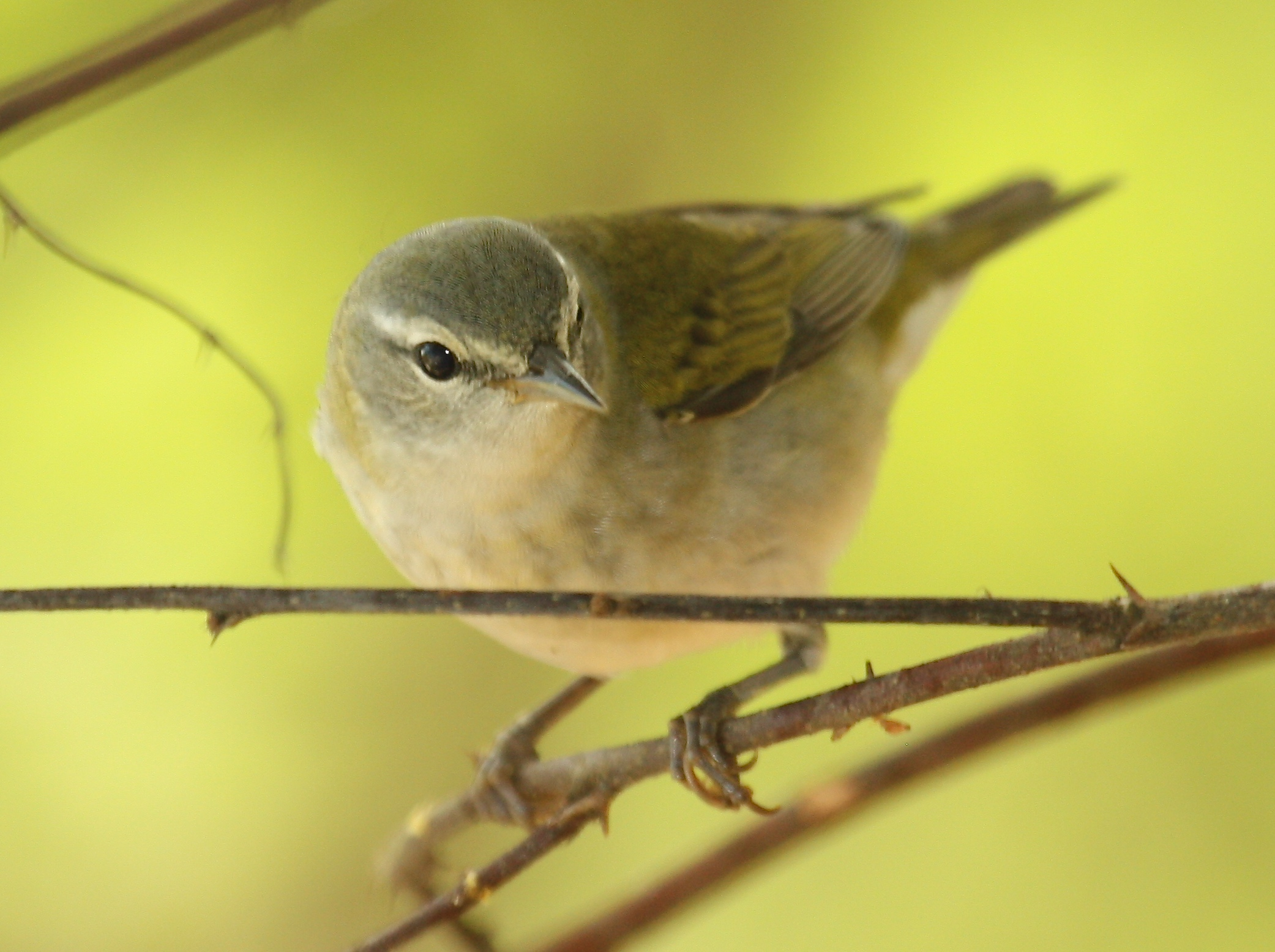
South Padre Island - Texas
