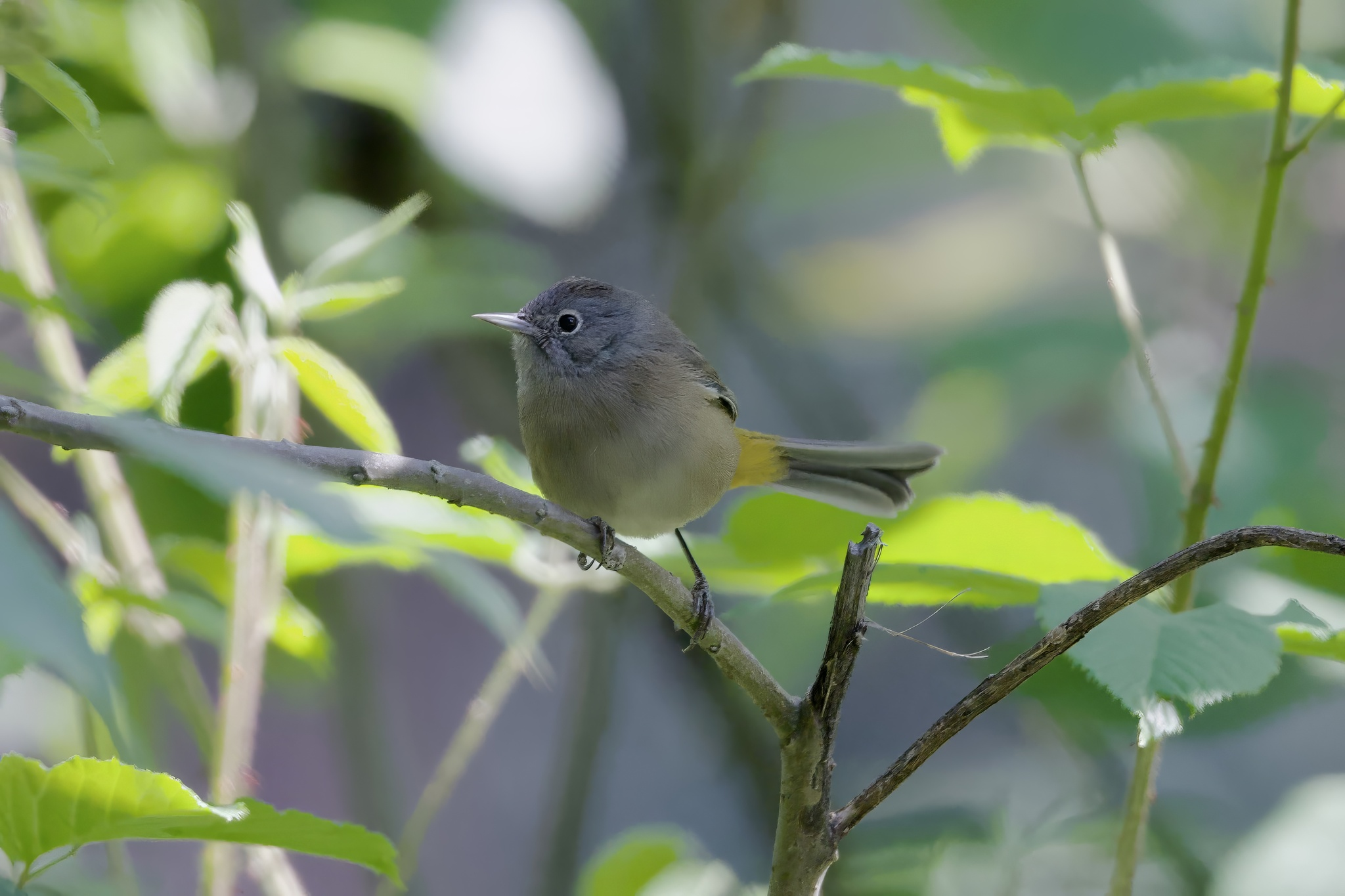
- Colima Warbler in Mexico

Conservation status
- Least Concern (IUCN 3.1)

Scientific classification
- Kingdom: Animalia
- Phylum: Chordata
- Class: Aves
- Order: Passeriformes
- Family: Parulidae
- Genus: Leiothlypis
- Species: L. crissalis

Binomial name
- Leiothlypis crissalis (Salvin & Godman, 1889)
- Range of O. crissalis Breeding range Winter range

Synonyms
- Vermivora crissalis Oreothlypis crissalis

= Colima warbler =

Species of bird

The Colima warbler (Leiothlypis crissalis) is a New World warbler. It is mainly found in the Sierra Madre Occidental and Oriental mountains of central Mexico, though its range just barely extends into adjacent southwestern Texas in the Chisos Mountains of Big Bend National Park.

The Colima warbler is about 4.5 to 5 inches (11 to 13 cm) long. They are mainly dark gray and brownish in coloration, with a pale underside. Their rump and the feathers below their tail are yellow. They have a white ring around their eye and a tinge of pale color on their breasts. Males have a spot of orange on the top of their heads.

In appearance, the Colima warbler is very similar to Virginia's warbler, but is larger in size, more robust, and heavier billed. Virginia's warbler has much more yellow or pale color on their breasts, which is grayer in the Colima warbler. The yellow above and below the tail is also more orange-yellow than the Colima warbler, and more greenish-yellow in Virginia's warblers.

== Life history ==
Nesting is done on the ground. Forming a loose cup-shaped nest of grass, leaves, and moss the Colima warbler hides its nest among the mountain rocks. It usually lays four eggs, which are white to cream-colored and speckled with brown.
