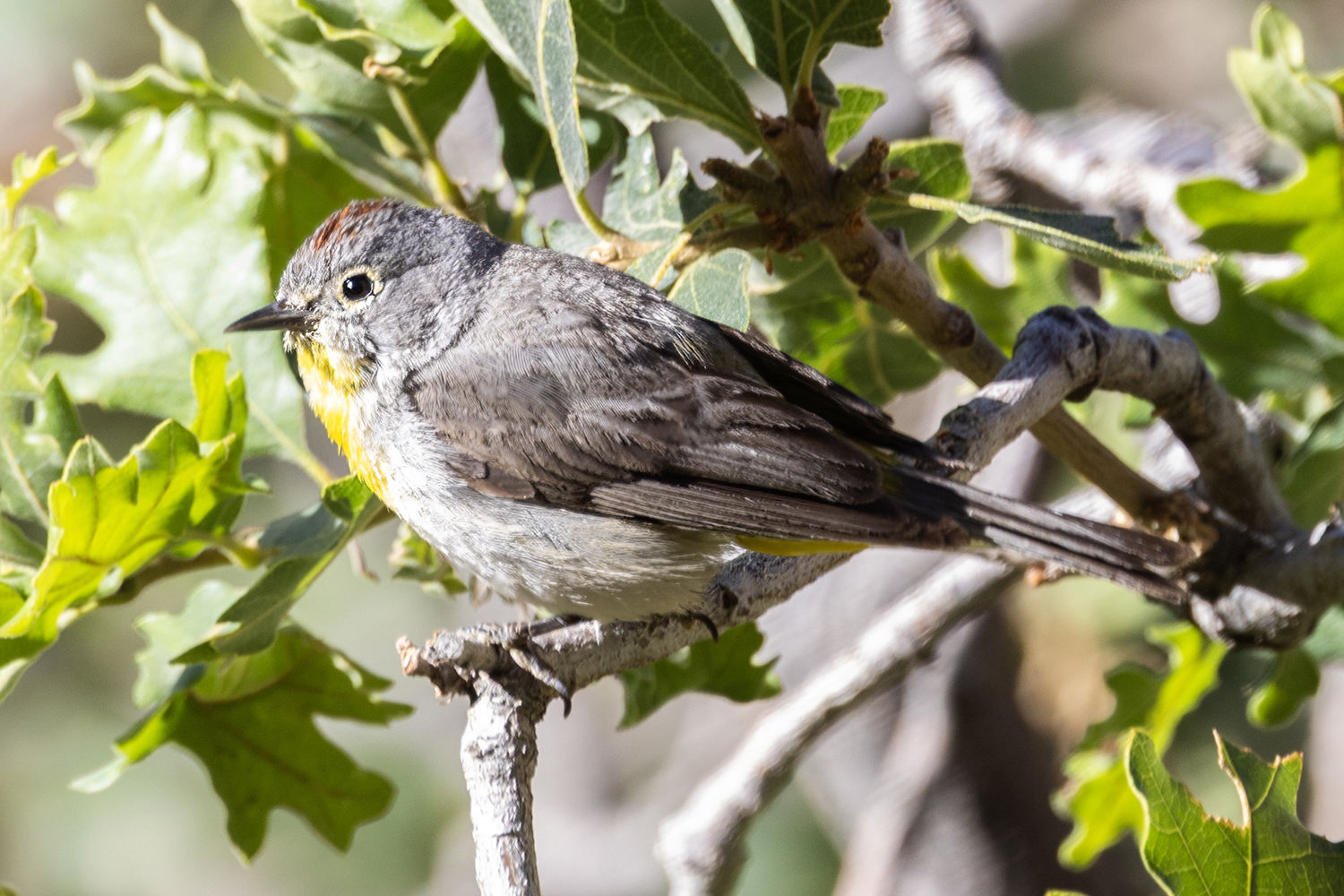

Conservation status
- Least Concern (IUCN 3.1)

Scientific classification
- Kingdom: Animalia
- Phylum: Chordata
- Class: Aves
- Order: Passeriformes
- Family: Parulidae
- Genus: Leiothlypis
- Species: L. virginiae

Binomial name
- Leiothlypis virginiae (Baird, 1860)
- Summer Winter

Synonyms
- Vermivora virginiae Oreothlypis virginiae Helminthophila virginiae

= Virginia's warbler =

Species of bird

Virginia's warbler (Leiothlypis virginiae) is a species of New World warbler.

Despite what its name may suggest, Virginia's warbler is not actually named after the American State of Virginia, which makes sense as the birds' typical range only reaches as far east as the state of Texas. The bird's common eastern range is central and southern mountains of Colorado, central Wyoming, and central and western New Mexico. The bird was named for Virginia Anderson, the wife of an army surgeon who discovered the bird at Fort Burgwin, New Mexico, in 1858. When Spencer Fullerton Baird of the Smithsonian Institution fully described the bird for science in 1860 he honored the wishes of the warbler's discoverer and designated Virginia to be both the bird's common and scientific name.

== Description ==
Virginia's warbler is a small bird, only 4 to 4 1/2 inches (100 to 110 mm) in length. It is mainly gray in color, with a lighter colored under-belly and a white eye ring. The rump and undertail coverts are yellow. They also have a yellow patch on their breast and a partially hidden dark reddish crest. Females are slightly duller, with less yellow on breast. Virginia's warbler can be easily mistaken for the rare Colima warbler, but it is smaller, has a more yellow rump, and is more widespread. Colima Warbler also lacks yellow breast patch.

== Life history ==
Virginia's warbler is common in dense oak and pinyon woodlands and brushy streamside hills at altitudes ranging from 6,000–9,000 ft (1,800–2,700 m). It summers in the south-western United States and will migrate as far south as Belize during the winter, as well as stopping in several Caribbean islands such as the Bahamas, Cuba, and the Turks and Caicos Islands.

Nests are built on the ground, hidden amongst dead leaves and tufts of grass at the base of a shrub or young tree. The nest is cup-shaped and constructed from moss, grass, strips of bark, and roots. The female will lay between three and five eggs, which are white in color and dotted with fine brown speckles. Young are attended to by both sexes, but incubation period and other nesting habits are mostly unknown.
