= Spy Pond =

Kettle hole pond in Arlington, MA, US

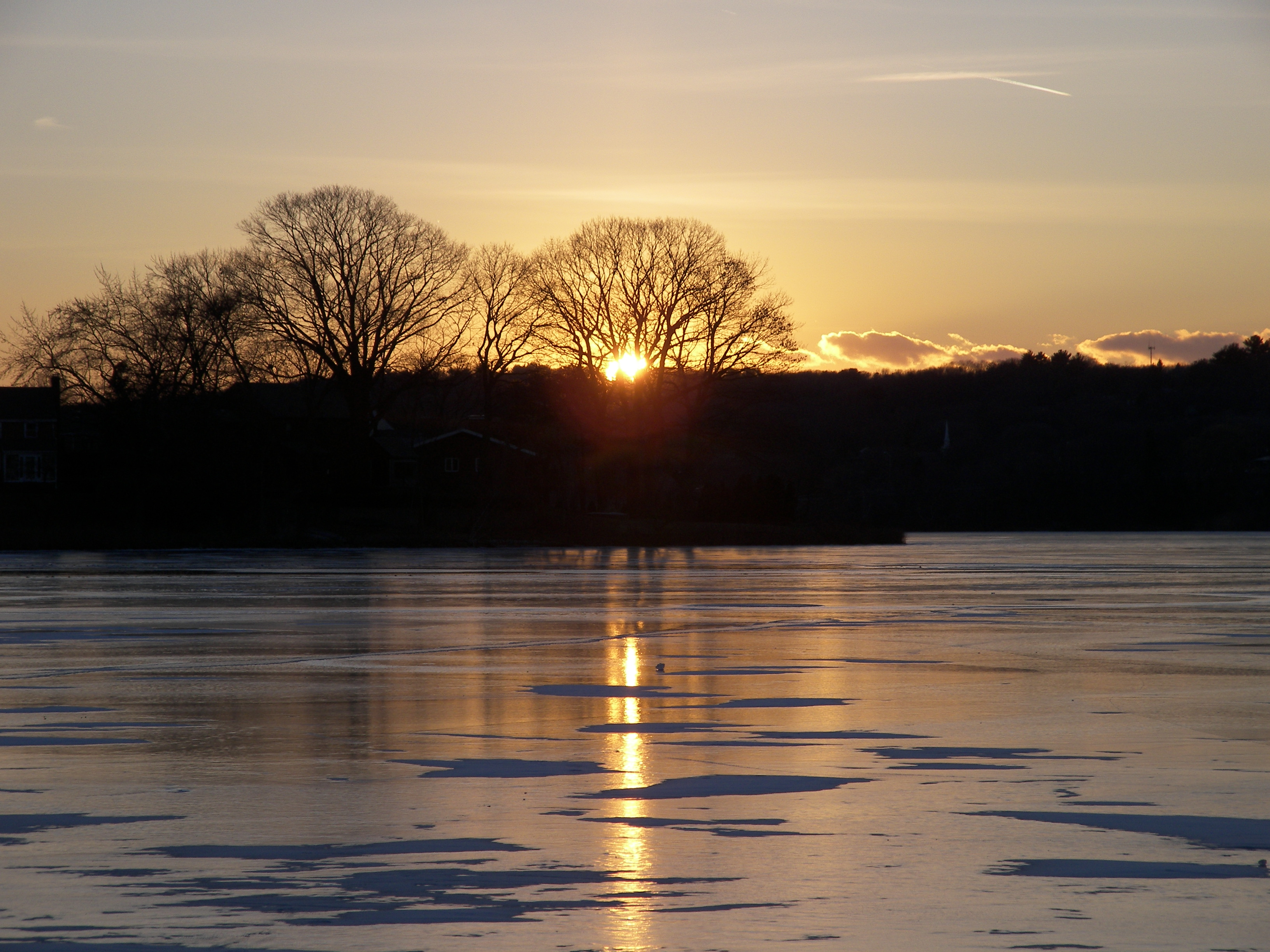
- Sunset in the winter

- Location within Massachusetts Location within the United States
- Location: Arlington, Massachusetts
- Coordinates: 42°24′28″N 71°09′22″W
- Type: kettle hole
- Basin countries: United States
- Surface area: 103 acres (42 ha)
- Average depth: 12 ft (3.7 m)
- Max. depth: 36 ft (11 m)

Spy Pond, also known as Spie Pond in the 17th and 18th centuries, is a 103-acre (0.42 km^{2}) kettle hole pond located near the heart of Arlington, Massachusetts, United States, adjacent to the Minuteman Bikeway.

== History ==
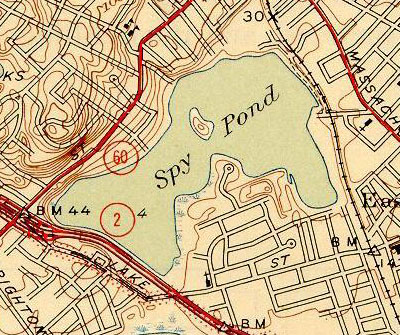
Spy Pond and environs. The rail line on the right is now the Minuteman Bikeway.

=== Geological history ===
Fifty thousand years ago, the area of Arlington where Spy Pond now sits was covered a mile deep in ice by the Wisconsin Glacier. Fifteen thousand years ago, the ice began to recede, leaving depressions or "kettle holes" in its wake. Initially filled with water from the receding glacier itself and then by natural runoff, the kettle holes eventually formed small lakes and ponds throughout the area.

Spy Pond is now fed by a combination of groundwater and surface runoff from the surrounding area. Spy Pond currently has an average depth of 12 feet (3.7 m) and a maximum depth of 36 feet (11 m).

The pond has a two-acre (0.8 ha) island, Elizabeth Island, which was privately owned (but undeveloped) until 2010, when Arlington Land Trust (in collaboration with the Massachusetts Audubon Society) agreed to purchase the property and set it aside for conservation.

=== Cultural history ===
On April 19, 1775, Mother Batherick, an elderly woman who liked to gather dandelions by Spy Pond, managed to corral and take prisoner six Revolutionary War Redcoats who were fleeing their captured supply train.

In 1850, the Spy Pond Water Company began piping water to West Cambridge. The Spy Pond Water Company changed its name to the Arlington Lake Company when West Cambridge was renamed Arlington in 1867. Spy Pond itself was also renamed to Arlington Lake (sometimes Lake Arlington) circa 1867, but the Spy Pond name persisted.

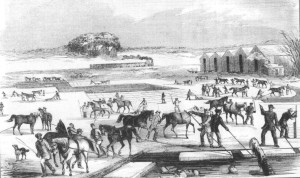
Ice harvesting at Spy Pond, from an 1854 print

During the Civil War the Union Army conducted training at Camp Sheppard near Spy Pond and following the war civilian rifle matches were conducted by the Massachusetts Rifle Association from 1875 through 1876 before their move to Woburn, Massachusetts.

The 19th century also saw Spy Pond become an industrial center as entrepreneurs sought to harvest the benefits of this natural resource for export. Spy Pond became a source for ice in the winter, cut into huge blocks for shipping, and pure water for nearby Boston in the summer. Businesses shipped Spy Pond ice as far away as India, installing huge amounts of infrastructure and equipment in the Arlington area in the process. This led to the development of the local railroad and large-scale manufacture of ice tools.

In the 1970s, the Wetland Protection Act was passed classifying Spy Pond as a great pond under Massachusetts law. Despite this classification, the Commonwealth of Massachusetts uses Spy Pond for drainage from Route 2, resulting in what Cori Beckwith, administrator of the Arlington Conservation Commission, describes as a "slightly hazardous" sandbar and states that "its [sic] costly" to remove.

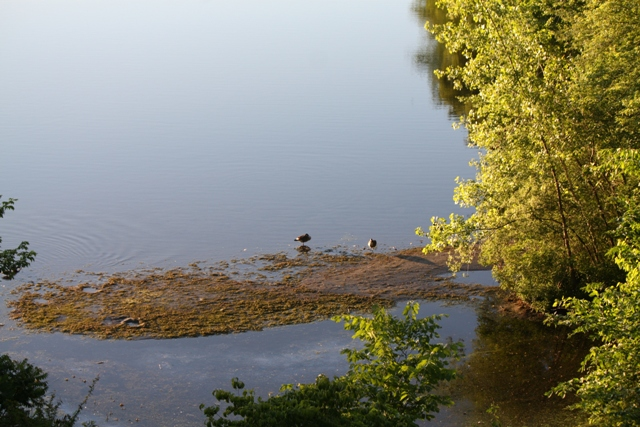
Spy Pond sandbar

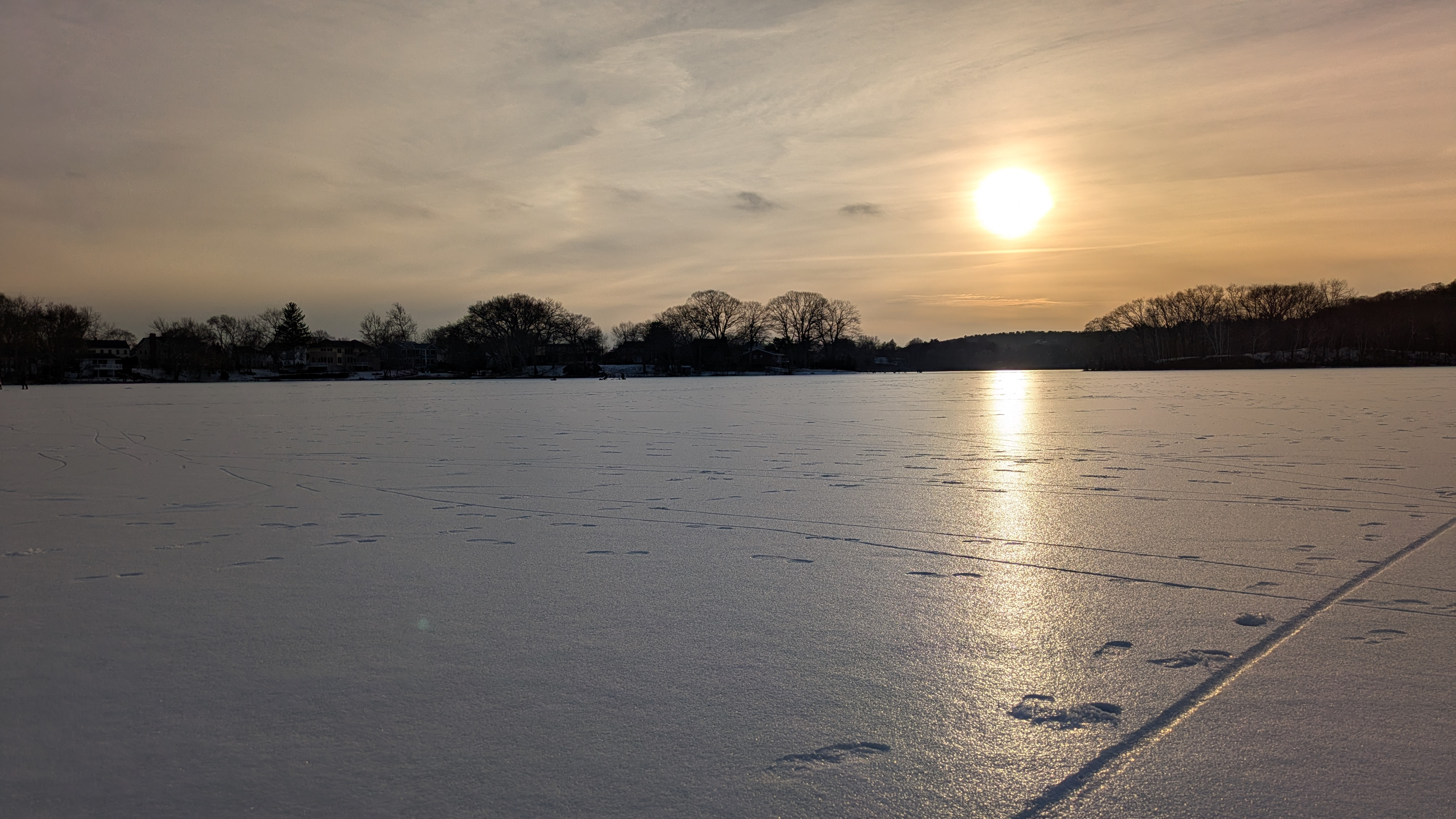
Spy Pond frozen in winter

== Wildlife ==
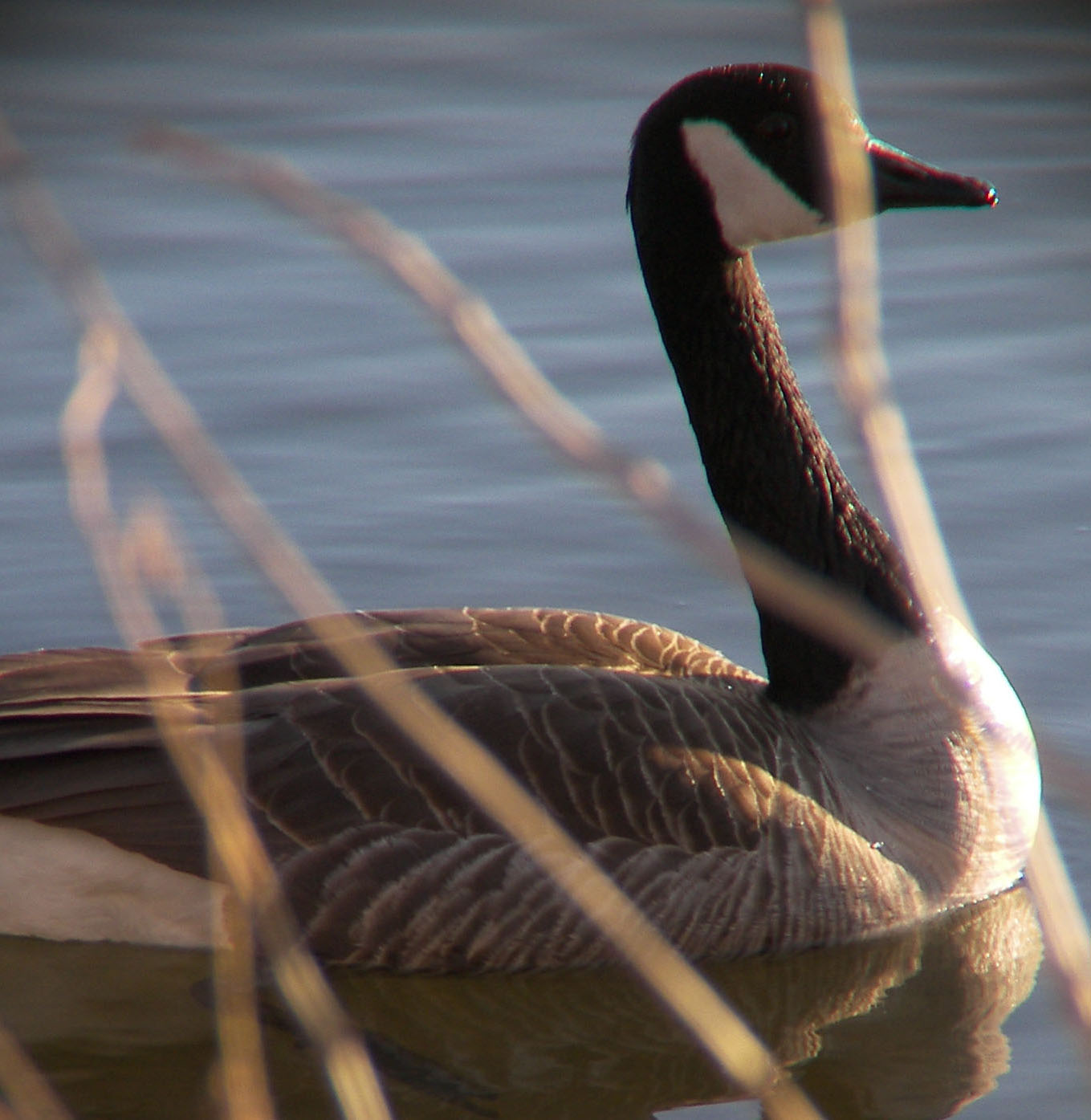
Canada goose at Spy Pond

=== Birds ===
Bird enthusiasts have tracked the native and migratory bird populations of Spy Pond for a number of years. They report that almost one hundred and twenty species of birds make their home in and along its shores at some point in the year. This list includes 32 swimmers and 86 non-swimmers.

Among the bird population, Canada geese are the most notable and controversial residents.

=== Fish ===
Spy Pond was stocked with fish through the 1990s, but budget cuts have meant no stocking since then. The pond contains a variety of species, including American eel, bluegill, carp, largemouth bass, white perch, yellow perch, pumpkinseed, black crappie, white crappie, gizzard shad, and tiger muskellunge. However, given the 10–12 year lifespan of tiger muskellunge and their inability to reproduce, it is believed Spy Pond no longer contains them, as the last stocking was over 15 years ago. Bucket biologists have illegally introduced northern pike in the last few years, some reaching more than 40 inches.

== See also ==
- Ponds
- List of Massachusetts birds
