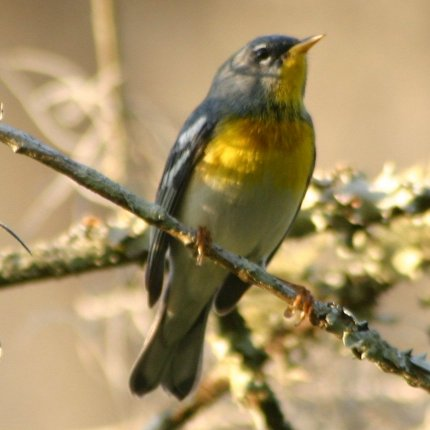
- Northern parula

Scientific classification
- Kingdom: Animalia
- Phylum: Chordata
- Class: Aves
- Order: Passeriformes
- Family: Parulidae
- Genus: Parula; Bonaparte, 1838

Species
- P. americana; P. pitiayumi

Synonyms
- Chloris Boie, 1826 (non Cuvier, 1800: preoccupied)

= Parula =

Genus of birds

Parula was formerly a small genus of New World warblers which breed in North and South America.

In 1758, Linnaeus classified the northern parula as a tit, Parus americanus, and as taxonomy developed the genus name was modified first to Parulus and then the current form. The family name, Parulidae, also derives from this source.

Most recently, the two species were:

- Northern parula, Parula americana
- Tropical parula, Parula pitiayumi

(Flame-throated and crescent-chested warblers were formerly classified in this genus.)

== Taxonomy ==
Recent genetic research has suggested that Parula and Setophaga are congeneric and should be merged. As the name Setophaga (published in 1827) takes priority over Parula (published in 1838), both the species would be transferred to Setophaga where this is accepted. This change has been accepted by the North American Classification Committee of the AOU, and the IOC., however the South American Classification Committee of the AOU continues to use the genus Parula.

== Biology ==
The northern parula winters south of its breeding ranges in Central America and the West Indies, where the tropical parula is a usually a permanent resident.

Parula warblers are tiny, 11–12 cm (4.3–4.7 in) long. They have yellow, orange or red throats, with the color extending further down the underparts in some species. The upperparts and wings are various shades of grey or blue-gray, and the mantle is greener or blacker than the rest of the back.

The breeding habitat is woodlands with clearings. These warblers nest low in a tree or on the ground, laying 3–7 eggs in a cup nest.

Parula warblers feed on insects and spiders, often caught by flycatching, and they have distinctive buzzing songs and loud chip calls.

== In art ==
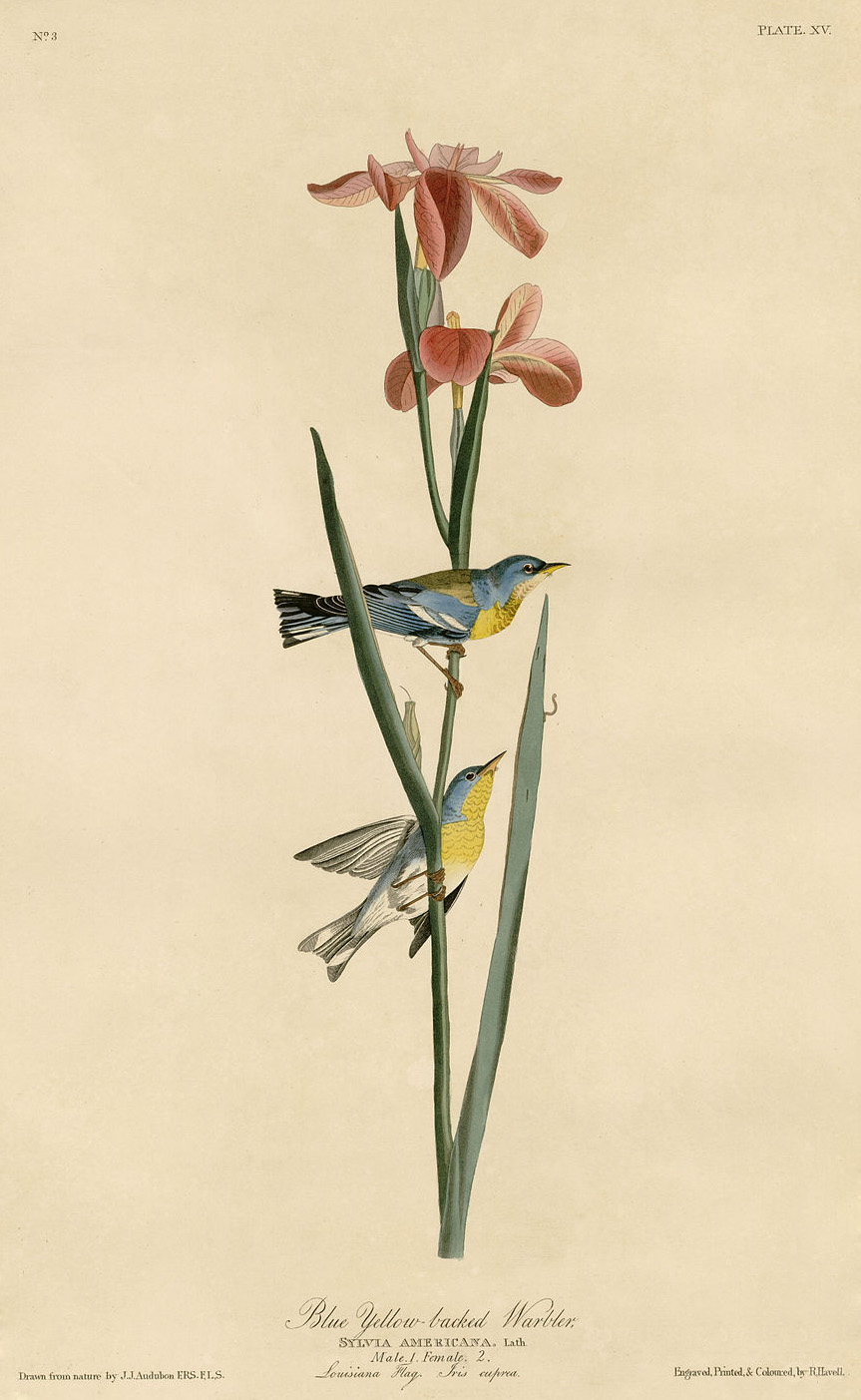
Audubon's Blue Yellow-backed Warbler (northern parula) from Birds of America

John James Audubon illustrated a pair of northern parulas in Birds of America (published in London 1827–1838), Plate 15 entitled "Blue Yellow-backed Warbler - Sylvia americana". The birds are shown perched on a Louisiana flag (Iris fulva) painted by Joseph Mason to which Audubon added the two birds in 1821. This led to a group of irises in Louisiana known as the "Louisiana irises". The image was engraved and colored by the Robert Havell, London workshops. The original watercolor by Audubon was purchased by the New York History Society where it remains as of January 2009.

== In data visualization ==
The distinctive color scheme of the Parula (a soft fade from blue to yellow) has led to a heat map color scheme with the same name, used as the default plotting colors in the MATLAB programming language since October 2014. Parula replaces the previous default, "Jet", which was a full rainbow-depiction color scheme. The company has stated that having a dichromatic color transition is an asset to data analysis as it eliminates the "apparent changes" that occur over a rainbow color scheme. (Note that even a perfectly smooth color gradient over a rainbow will appear to have distinct stripes, which can obscure more subtle gradients in the data.) The Parula colormap also has the effect that when plotted in grayscale, the colors also map to a smooth gradient from dark to light grey.

== Sources ==
- New World Warblers by Curson, Quinn and Beadle, ISBN 0-7136-3932-6
- ffrench, Richard (1991). A Guide to the Birds of Trinidad and Tobago (2nd ed.). Comstock Publishing. ISBN 0-8014-9792-2.
- Hilty, Steven L (2003). Birds of Venezuela. London: Christopher Helm. ISBN 0-7136-6418-5.
- dictionary.com for derivation
- Merriam Webster dictionary for derivation
