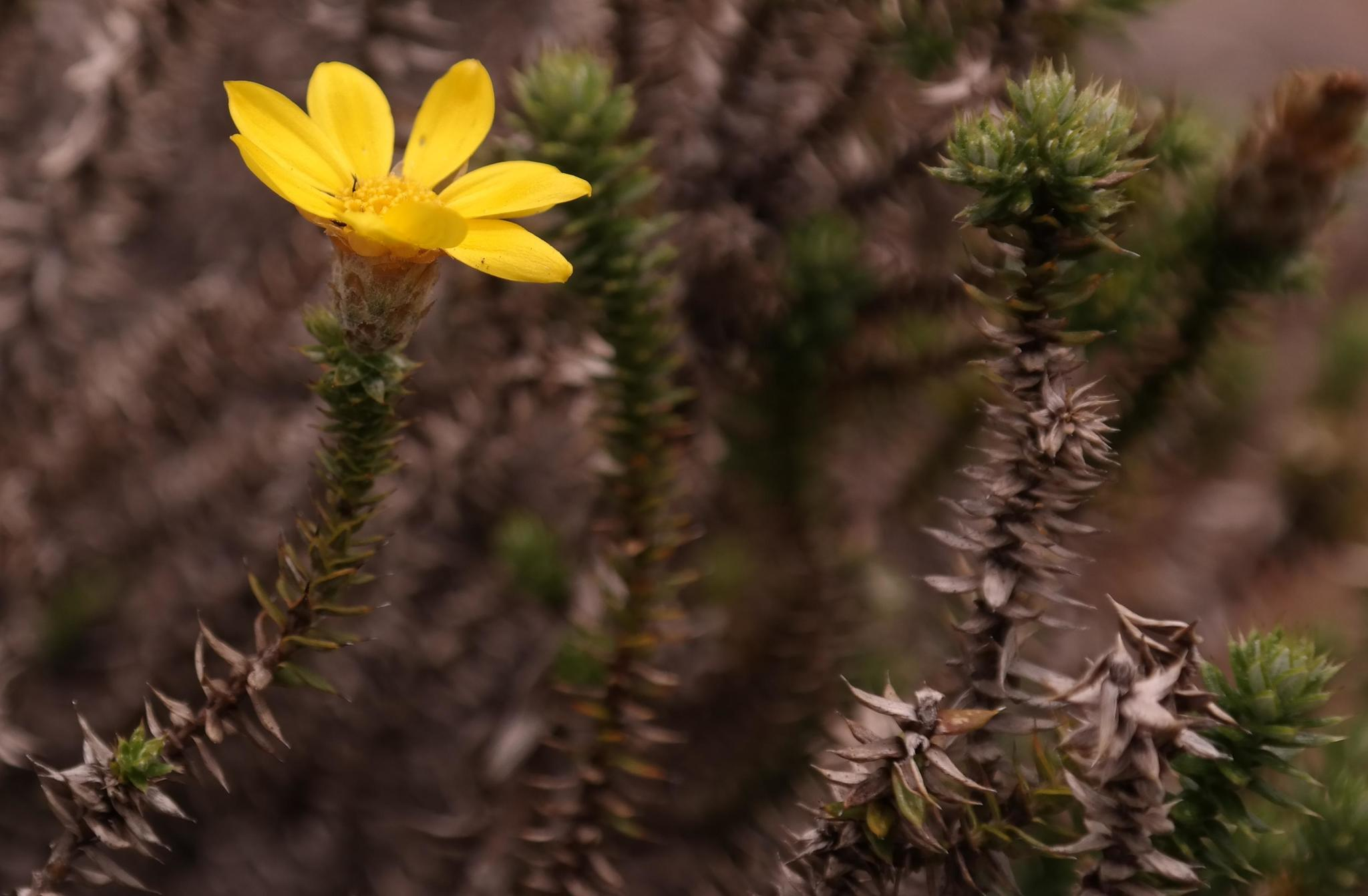

Scientific classification
- Kingdom: Plantae
- Clade: Embryophytes
- Clade: Tracheophytes
- Clade: Angiosperms
- Clade: Eudicots
- Clade: Asterids
- Order: Asterales
- Family: Asteraceae
- Genus: Arrowsmithia
- Species: A. styphelioides

Binomial name
- Arrowsmithia styphelioides DC.

Synonyms
- Macowania styphelioides (DC.) Kroner

= Arrowsmithia styphelioides =

Species of flowering plant

Arrowsmithia styphelioides is a species of flowering plant in the family Asteraceae. It is endemic to the Cape Province region of South Africa.
