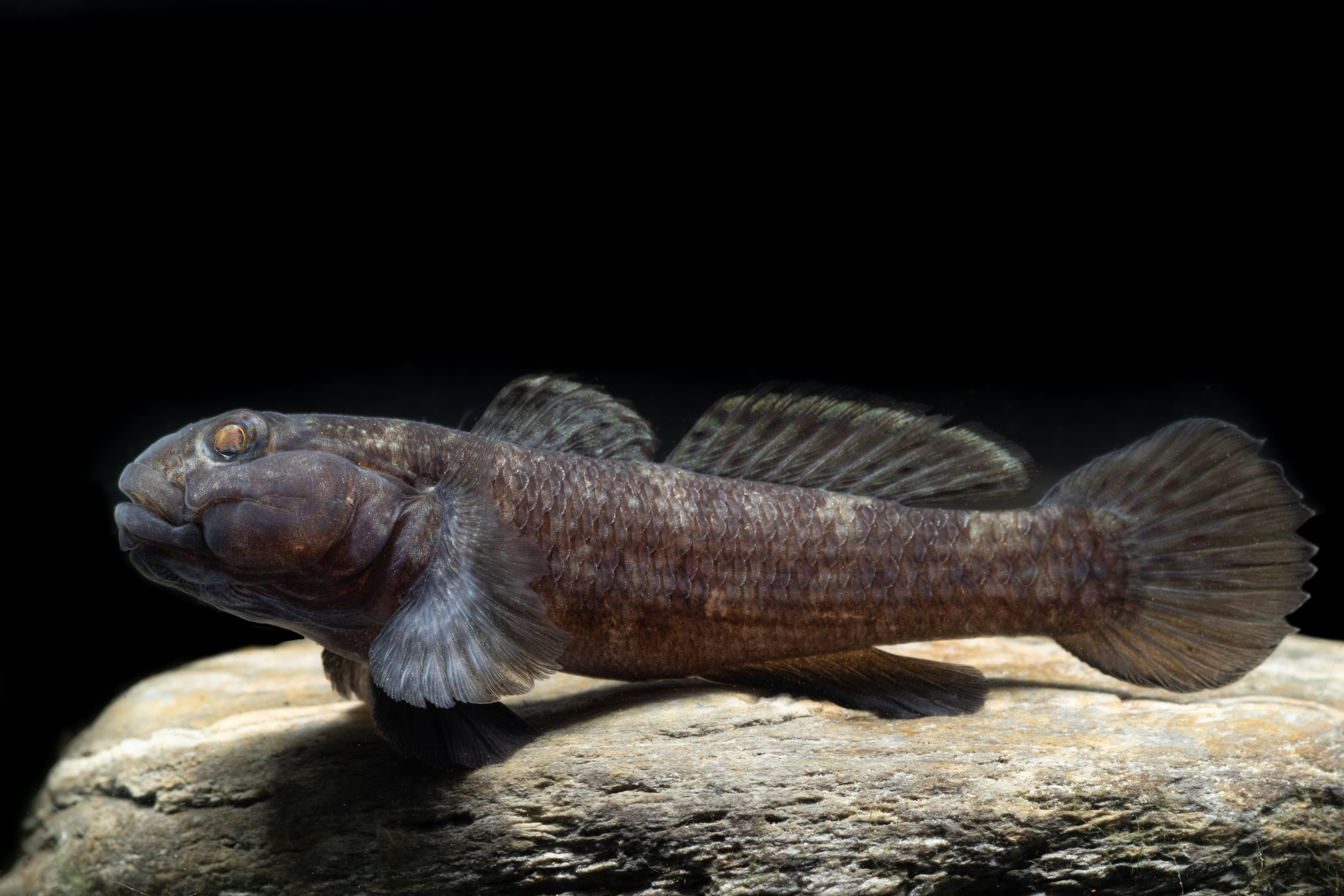

Conservation status
- Least Concern (IUCN 3.1)

Scientific classification
- Kingdom: Animalia
- Phylum: Chordata
- Class: Actinopterygii
- Order: Gobiiformes
- Family: Gobiidae
- Genus: Bathygobius
- Species: B. meggitti

Binomial name
- Bathygobius meggitti (Hora & Mukerji, 1936)

Synonyms
- Bathygobius blancoi Roxas & Ablan, 1940; Ctenogobius meggitti Hora & Mukerji, 1936

= Bathygobius meggitti =

Species of fish

Bathygobius meggitti is a species of Goby fish, also known as Meggitt's goby, Meggitt's frillgoby, or the brownlined goby, in the Bathygobius genus and Gobiidae family. It is native to Australia and can be found in rocky pools in intertidal zones and rocky shores, along the country's northern coastline.

== Description ==
B. meggitti has seven dorsal spines, eight dorsal soft rays, one anal spine, and eight anal soft rays. The maximum length is 6 cm (2.4 in). The male is mostly yellowish grey, but with white and dull orange spots.

== Synonym ==
It was originally named Ctenogobius meggitti but was later moved to the Bathygobius genus.
