= River barrier hypothesis =

Hypothesis seeking to partially explain the high species diversity in the Amazon Basin

Amazon River System

The river barrier hypothesis is a hypothesis seeking to partially explain the high species diversity in the Amazon Basin, first presented by Alfred Russel Wallace in his 1852 paper On Monkeys of the Amazon. It argues that the formation and movement of the Amazon and some of its tributaries presented a significant enough barrier to movement for wildlife populations to precipitate allopatric speciation. Facing different selection pressures and genetic drift, the divided populations diverged into separate species.

There are several observable qualities that should be present if speciation has resulted from a river barrier. Divergence of species on either side of the river should increase with the size of the river, expressing weakly or not at all in the headwaters and more strongly in the wider, deeper channels further downriver. Organisms endemic to terra firme forest should be more affected than those that live in alluvial forests alongside the river, as they have a longer distance to cross before reaching appropriate habitat and lowland populations can rejoin relatively frequently when a river shifts or narrows in the early stages of oxbow lake formation. Finally, if a river barrier is the cause of speciation, sister species should exist on opposing shores more frequently than expected by chance.

== Mechanisms ==
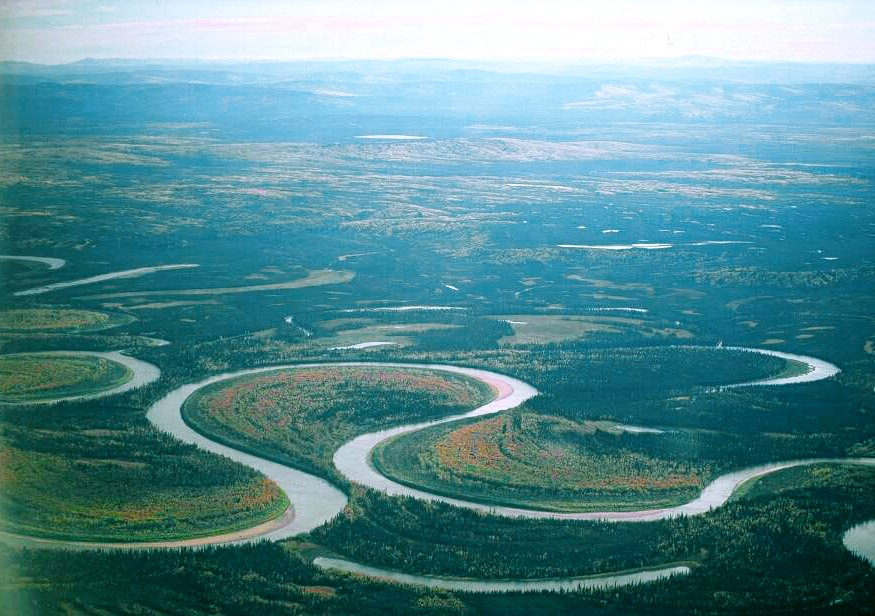
Oxbow River Formation

River barrier speciation occurs when a river is of sufficient size to provide a vicariance for allopatric speciation, or when the river is large enough to prevent or interfere with a genetic exchange between populations. Population division is initiated either when a river shifts into or forms within the range of a species that cannot cross it, effectively splitting the population in half, or when a small founder group is transported across an existing river through random chance. Usually a river's strength as a barrier is viewed as proportional to its width; wider rivers present a longer crossing distance and thus a greater obstacle to movement. Barrier strength varies within a given river; narrow headwaters are easier to cross than wide downstream channels. Rivers that present a barrier for some species in a region may not necessarily do so for all, leading to species-by-species and clade, or genetically distinct group, differences in degree of isolation and differentiation on opposing shores. Large mammals and birds have little trouble crossing most streams, whereas small birds unaccustomed to long-distance flight can have particular difficulties and thus may be more subject to population division. Additionally, rivers more effectively divide species that prefer terra firme forest as meanders and the process of oxbow formation in alluvial regions can narrow otherwise impassable streams.

== Support ==
Many research projects in the Amazon basin aimed to test the validity of the hypothesis. The southern chestnut-tailed antbird (Myrmeciza hemimelaena) is a species that exemplifies the hypothesis in nature. The antbirds' diversification and distribution were examined throughout the Amazon, three monophyletic, genetically distinct, populations of the bird were found; two of them are currently valid subspecies. Two of the clades existed on either side of the Madeira River and the third one had a range in between the Madeira River and two small tributaries Jiparaná and Aripuanã. This shows evidence of how these birds diversified due to possible riverine barriers, causing a limitation in gene flow. Another study found that saddle-back tamarins follow the premise that variant gene flow occurs at different parts of a river. Gene flow was found to be restricted to the narrower headwaters of rivers, while a decrease was observed toward the mouth. This is consistent with the hypothesis. Yet, some speculate that using a single mechanism to explain diversification in the tropics would be an oversimplification. For example, there is evidence that genetic variation in the Blue-crowned Manakin may have been influenced by river barriers, Andean uplift, and range expansions.

== Critique ==
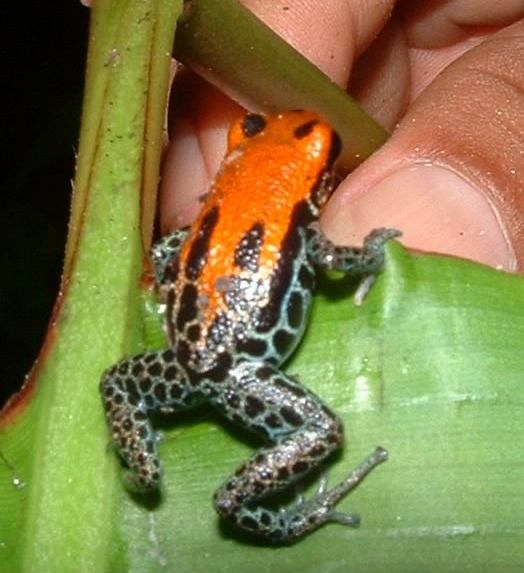
Red-backed poison frog (Dendrobates reticulatus)

Not all studies have found support for the hypothesis. One study tested the riverine hypothesis by observing populations of four species of Amazonian frogs along the Juruá River. The team expected to see gene flow of different volumes when comparing sites that were on the same bank to sites that were across the river. They found that this was not the case. Gene flow seemed to be in almost equal quantities between either set of sites.

Another study took the hypothesis a step further. They postulated that since rivers are supposed to be barriers for gene flow for certain taxa, then it should be a barrier at a community level. Variation in species of frogs and small mammals along and across the riverbanks of the Juruá River was evaluated. No obvious gradient of decreasing similarity in species of frogs and mammals from the headwaters to the mouth of the river was found. Another discovery was that there was no greater similarity between species that lived on the same bank than those that were on opposite banks of the river.

These results indirectly dispute the aspects of the hypothesis that insist on speciation caused by riverine barriers. The validity of the hypothesis was tested further by examining poison dart frogs. This study (Lougheed et al.)'s results were incongruent with the hypothesis that species on either side of a river would be monophyletic relatives. The Lougheed study aimed to show that the ridge hypothesis has more credibility than the river hypothesis. Eighty-one species of non-flying mammals were trapped at cross-river sites along the Juruá River in another experiment. The river seemed to be a barrier for only a few taxa, with the majority either homogeneous throughout the research area or divided into monophyletic upriver and downriver clades. Patton argues that the geographic location of these clades suggest that landform evolution is an under-appreciated factor in diversification in Amazonia. This project further suggests that riverine barriers are not the only mechanism for speciation.

All these critics argue that other factors influence speciation in Amazonia. Another shortcoming of the hypothesis is that it has been researched mostly in Amazonia, rather than in other river basins. Also, shifts of rivers may prevent the establishment of any patterns across rivers, further complicating means to test for the strength of the hypothesis.
