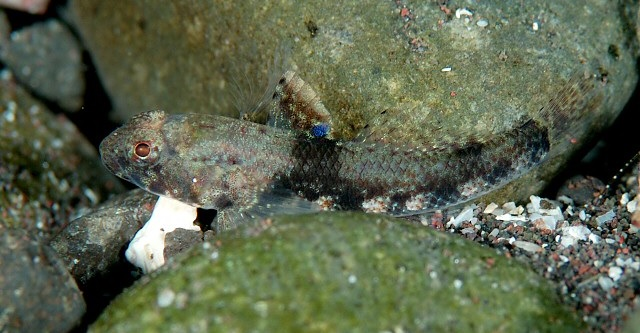

Conservation status
- Least Concern (IUCN 3.1)

Scientific classification
- Kingdom: Animalia
- Phylum: Chordata
- Class: Actinopterygii
- Order: Gobiiformes
- Family: Gobiidae
- Genus: Bathygobius
- Species: B. fuscus

Binomial name
- Bathygobius fuscus (Rüppell, 1830)

Synonyms
- Gobius fuscus Rüppell, 1830; Gobius punctillatus Rüppell, 1830; Gobius nebulopunctatus Valenciennes, 1837; Gobius obscurus Peters, 1855; Gobius samberanoensis Bleeker, 1867; Bathygobius samberanoensis (Bleeker, 1867); Gobius vergeri Bleeker, 1867; Bathygobius vergeri (Bleeker, 1867); Stenogobius vergeri (Bleeker, 1867); Gobius darnleyensis Alleyne & Macleay, 1877; Gobius nigripinnis Alleyne & Macleay, 1877; Gobius marginalis De Vis, 1884

= Bathygobius fuscus =

Species of fish

The dusky frillgoby (Bathygobius fuscus), also known as the brown frillfin, is a species of goby which is found in the Indo-Pacific region from the South Africa north to the Red Sea and east as far as Tonga, south to Australia and north to Japan. It is a mainly coastal speciesbut it has an amphidromous life cycle and it occurs in estuaries and will move into in freshwater streams. In estuarine areas it is found mainly in the creeks preferring environments with sand and rubble, soft coral and open reefs. It feeds on detritus, as well as feeding on crustaceans, fish and algae and it is a benthic spawner. The maximum total length is 12 centimetres (4.7 in).

Dusky frillgoby swimming in captivity
