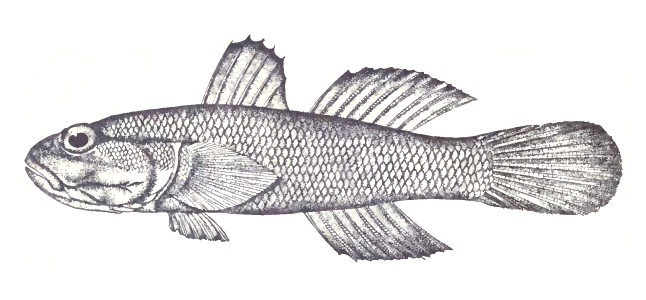
- Cheekscaled frill-goby (B. cotticeps)

Scientific classification
- Kingdom: Animalia
- Phylum: Chordata
- Class: Actinopterygii
- Division: Teleostei
- Order: Gobiiformes
- Family: Gobiidae
- Subfamily: Gobiinae
- Genus: Bathygobius; Bleeker, 1878

Type species
- Gobius nebulopunctatus Valenciennes, 1837

Synonyms
- Chlamydes O. P. Jenkins, 1903; Koumansiasis Visweswara Rao, 1967; Mapo Smitt, 1900; Pyosicus J. L. B. Smith, 1960

= Bathygobius =

Genus of fishes

Bathygobius is a circumtropical genus of fish in the family Gobiidae.

== Species ==
There are currently 27 recognized species in this genus:

- Bathygobius aeolosoma (J. D. Ogilby, 1889)
- Bathygobius andrei (Sauvage, 1880)
- Bathygobius antilliensis Tornabene, C. C. Baldwin & Pezold, 2010 (Antilles frillfin)
- Bathygobius brasiliensis Carvalho-Filho & de Araújo, 2017
- Bathygobius burtoni (O'Shaughnessy, 1875)
- Bathygobius casamancus (Rochebrune, 1880)
- Bathygobius coalitus (E. T. Bennett, 1832) (Whitespotted frillgoby)
- Bathygobius cocosensis (Bleeker, 1854) (Cocos frill-goby)
- Bathygobius cotticeps (Steindachner, 1879) (Cheekscaled frill-goby)
- Bathygobius curacao (Metzelaar, 1919) (Notchtongue goby)
- Bathygobius cyclopterus (Valenciennes, 1837) (Spotted frillgoby)
- Bathygobius fishelsoni Goren, 1978
- Bathygobius fuscus (Rüppell, 1830) (Dusky frillgoby)
- Bathygobius geminatus Tornabene, C. C. Baldwin & Pezold, 2010 (Twin-spotted frillfin)
- Bathygobius hongkongensis C. Lam, 1986
- Bathygobius kreftii (Steindachner, 1866) (Krefft's frillgoby)
- Bathygobius lacertus (Poey, 1860)
- Bathygobius laddi (Fowler, 1931) (Brownboy goby)
- Bathygobius lineatus (Jenyns, 1841) (Southern frillfin)
- Bathygobius meggitti (Hora & Mukerji, 1936) (Meggitt's goby)
- Bathygobius mero G. R. Allen, Erdmann & Nisha K. Ichida, 2024
- Bathygobius mystacium Ginsburg, 1947 (Island frillfin)
- Bathygobius niger (J. L. B. Smith, 1960) (Black minigoby)
- Bathygobius panayensis (D. S. Jordan & Seale, 1907)
- Bathygobius petrophilus (Bleeker, 1853)
- Bathygobius ramosus Ginsburg, 1947 (Panamic frillfin)
- Bathygobius soporator (Valenciennes, 1837) (Frillfin goby)
