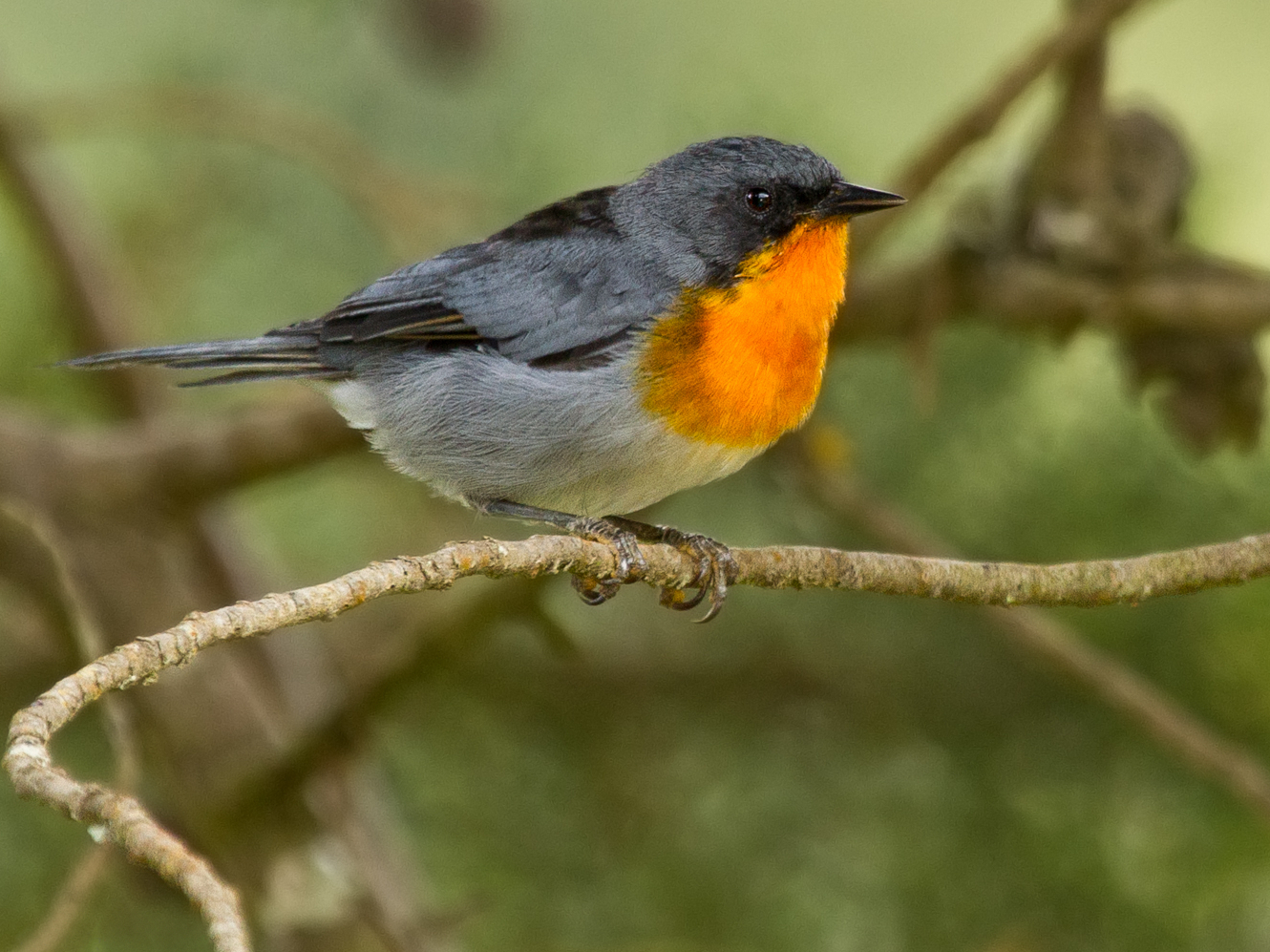
- Flame-throated warbler (Oreothlypis gutturalis)

Scientific classification
- Kingdom: Animalia
- Phylum: Chordata
- Class: Aves
- Order: Passeriformes
- Family: Parulidae
- Genus: Oreothlypis; Ridgway, 1884

Type species
- Compsothlypis gutturalis Cabanis, 1860

Species
- See text.

Synonyms
- Leiothlypis Sangster, 2008

= Oreothlypis =

Genus of birds

Oreothlypis is a genus of New World warbler. Most members of this genus were formerly classified in the genus Vermivora. However, the species then in Vermivora were more closely related to the flame-throated warbler and crescent-chested warbler, then classed in Parula, than to other species of Vermivora. Initially, the new genus Leiothlypis was proposed for these species by Sangster in 2008, but the American Ornithologists' Union opted to classify them along with the flame-throated and crescent-chested warblers in the existing genus Oreothlypis, though accepted the change in 2019.

== Species ==
Genus Oreothlypis – Ridgway, 1884 – two species
Common name	Scientific name and subspecies	Range	Size and ecology	IUCN status and estimated population
Flame-throated warbler	Oreothlypis gutturalis (Cabanis, 1861)	Costa Rica and western Panama	Size: Habitat: Diet:	LC
Crescent-chested warbler	Oreothlypis superciliosa (Hartlaub, 1844)	northern Mexico to northern Nicaragua.	Size: Habitat: Diet:	LC
