= Bathygobius burtoni =

Conservation status
- Endangered (IUCN 3.1)

Scientific classification
- Kingdom: Animalia
- Phylum: Chordata
- Class: Actinopterygii
- Order: Gobiiformes
- Family: Gobiidae
- Genus: Bathygobius
- Species: B. burtoni

Binomial name
- Bathygobius burtoni (O'Shaughnessy, 1875)

Synonyms
- Gobius burtoni O'Shaughnessy, 1875

Species of fish

Bathygobius burtoni is a species of goby native to the Atlantic shores of western Africa where it is a denizen of tide pools. This species can reach a total length of 8 cm (3.1 in). The specific name honours Captain Sir Richard Francis Burton (1821-1890), the English explorer, geographer, translator, writer, soldier, orientalist, cartographer, ethnologist, spy, linguist, poet, fencer, and diplomat, who collected the type specimen. This species has a very limited distribution and is known from only five locations in an area in which there has been a huge increase in the human population and the IUCN has assessed this species an Endangered.
