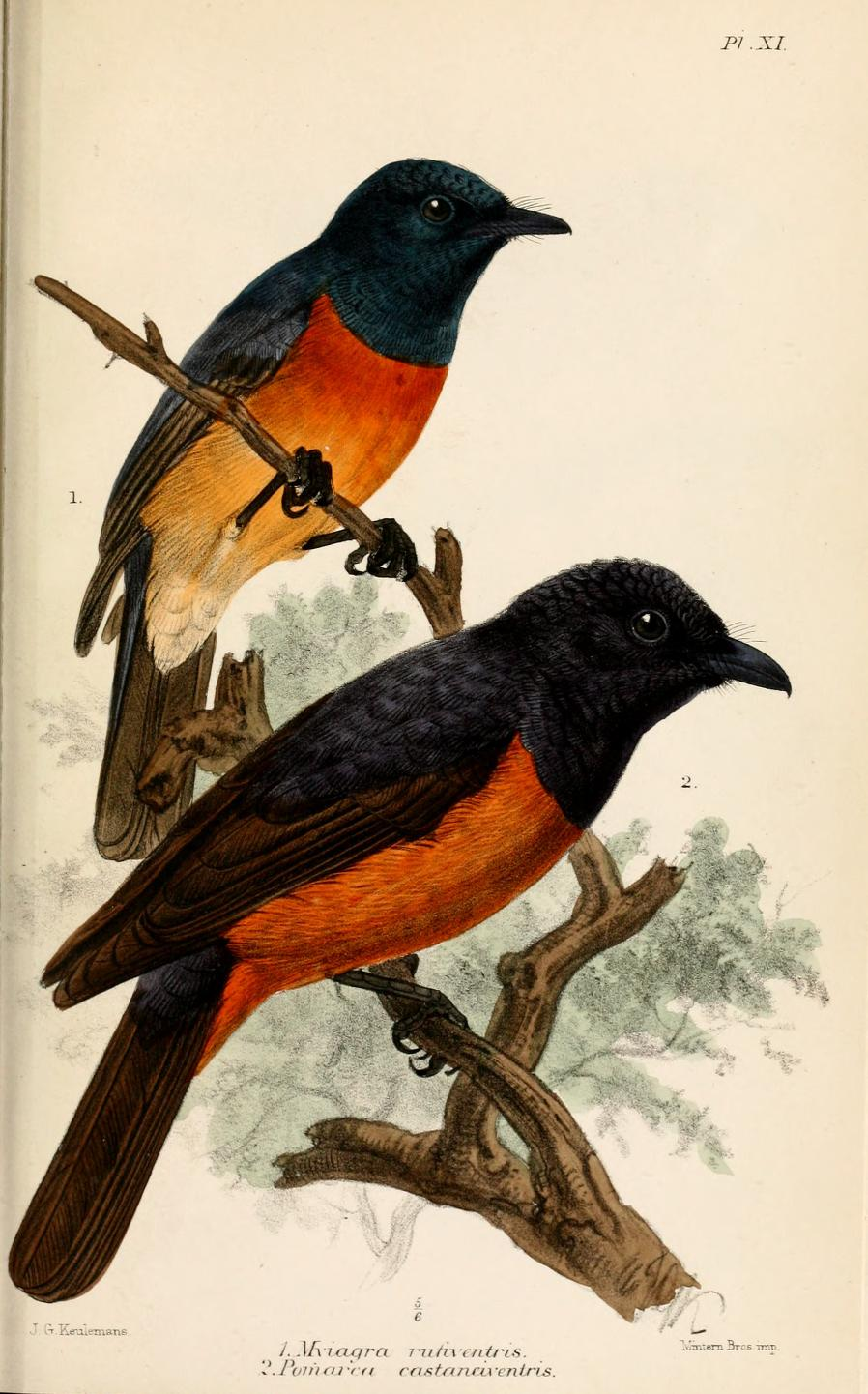
- Chestnut-bellied monarch (below); illustration by Keulemans, 1879
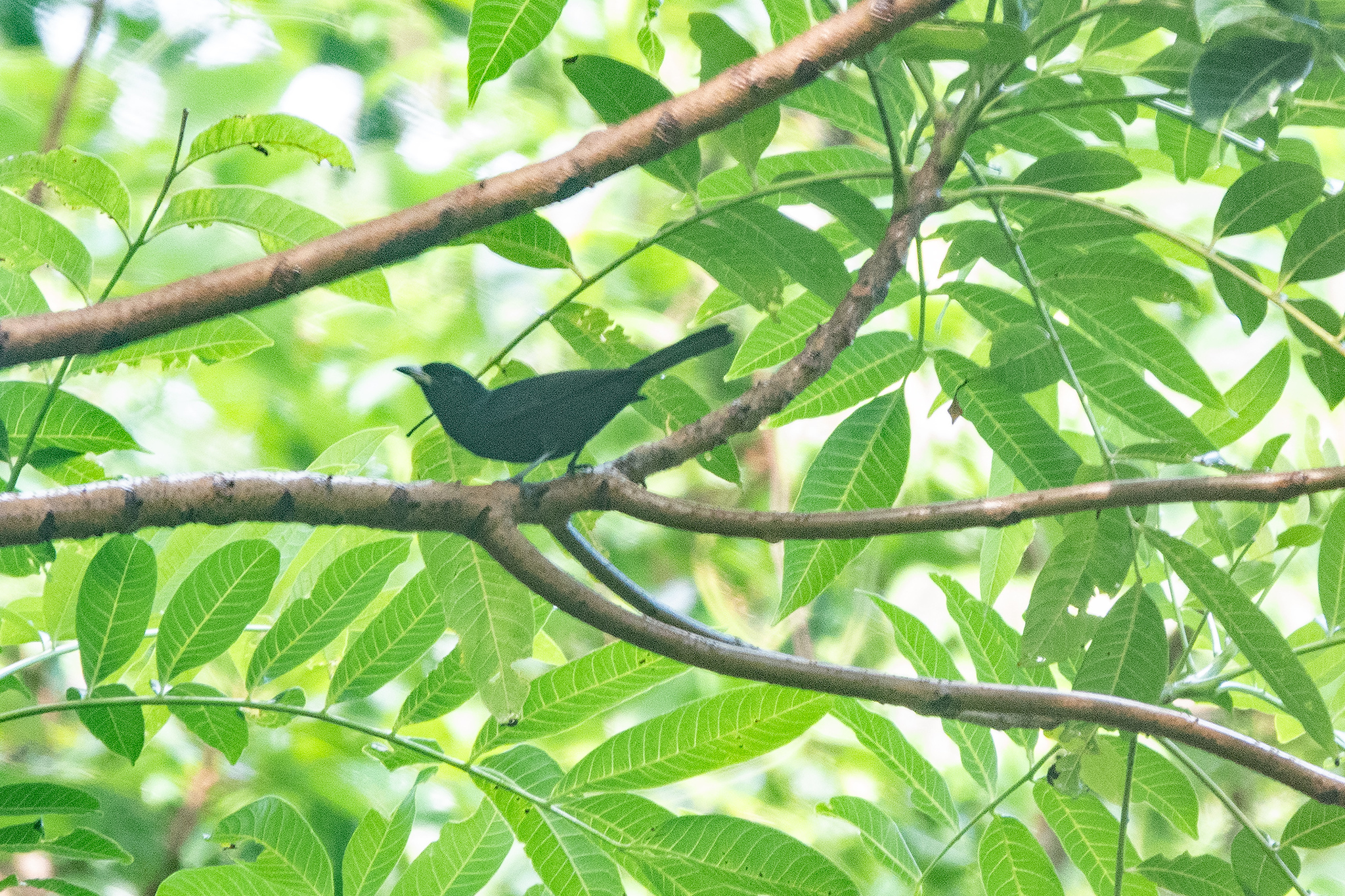
- Monarcha castaneiventris ugiensis

Conservation status
- Least Concern (IUCN 3.1)

Scientific classification
- Kingdom: Animalia
- Phylum: Chordata
- Class: Aves
- Order: Passeriformes
- Family: Monarchidae
- Genus: Monarcha
- Species: M. castaneiventris

Binomial name
- Monarcha castaneiventris Verreaux, 1858

Subspecies
- See text

= Chestnut-bellied monarch =

Species of bird

The chestnut-bellied monarch (Monarcha castaneiventris) or chestnut-bellied monarch-flycatcher is a species of bird in the family Monarchidae. It is endemic to the Solomon Islands.

== Subspecies ==
Five subspecies are recognised:

- Monarcha castaneiventris erythrostictus (Sharpe, 1888) – Buka Island, Bougainville Island, Shortland Islands and Fauro Island (north Solomon Islands)
- Monarcha castaneiventris castaneiventris Verreaux, J, 1858 – Choiseul Island, Santa Isabel, Florida Islands, Guadalcanal, Savo Island (north of northwest Guadalcanal) and Malaita (central, southeast Solomon Islands)
- Monarcha castaneiventris obscurior Mayr, 1935 – Russell Islands (central south Solomon Islands)
- Monarcha castaneiventris megarhynchus Rothschild & Hartert, EJO, 1908 – Makira (southeast Solomon Islands)
- Monarcha castaneiventris ugiensis (Ramsay, EP, 1882) – Ugi Island and Olu Malau Islands (or Three Sisters) (north of Makira), and Owaraha (Santa Ana) and Santa Catalina (or Owariki) (east of Makira; southeast Solomon Islands

Monarcha castaneiventris erythrostictus has sometimes been treated as a separate species, the Bougainville monarch

== Behaviour and ecology ==
In 2009, it was reported that a genetic change in some members of this species caused their colouration and songs to be different from other members of the species. As a result, members in one group did not recognize members in the other, so the two groups became reproductively isolated from each other. It was thought that over time, this could eventually lead to the creation of a new species, and that this was an example of biological evolution.
