= Bathygobius andrei =

Conservation status
- Least Concern (IUCN 3.1)

Scientific classification
- Kingdom: Animalia
- Phylum: Chordata
- Class: Actinopterygii
- Order: Gobiiformes
- Family: Gobiidae
- Genus: Bathygobius
- Species: B. andrei

Binomial name
- Bathygobius andrei (Sauvage, 1880)

Species of ray-finned fish

Bathygobius andrei, commonly known as estuarine frillfin, is a species of ray-finned fish in the family Gobiidae.

It is indigenous to the western coast of Central America.
