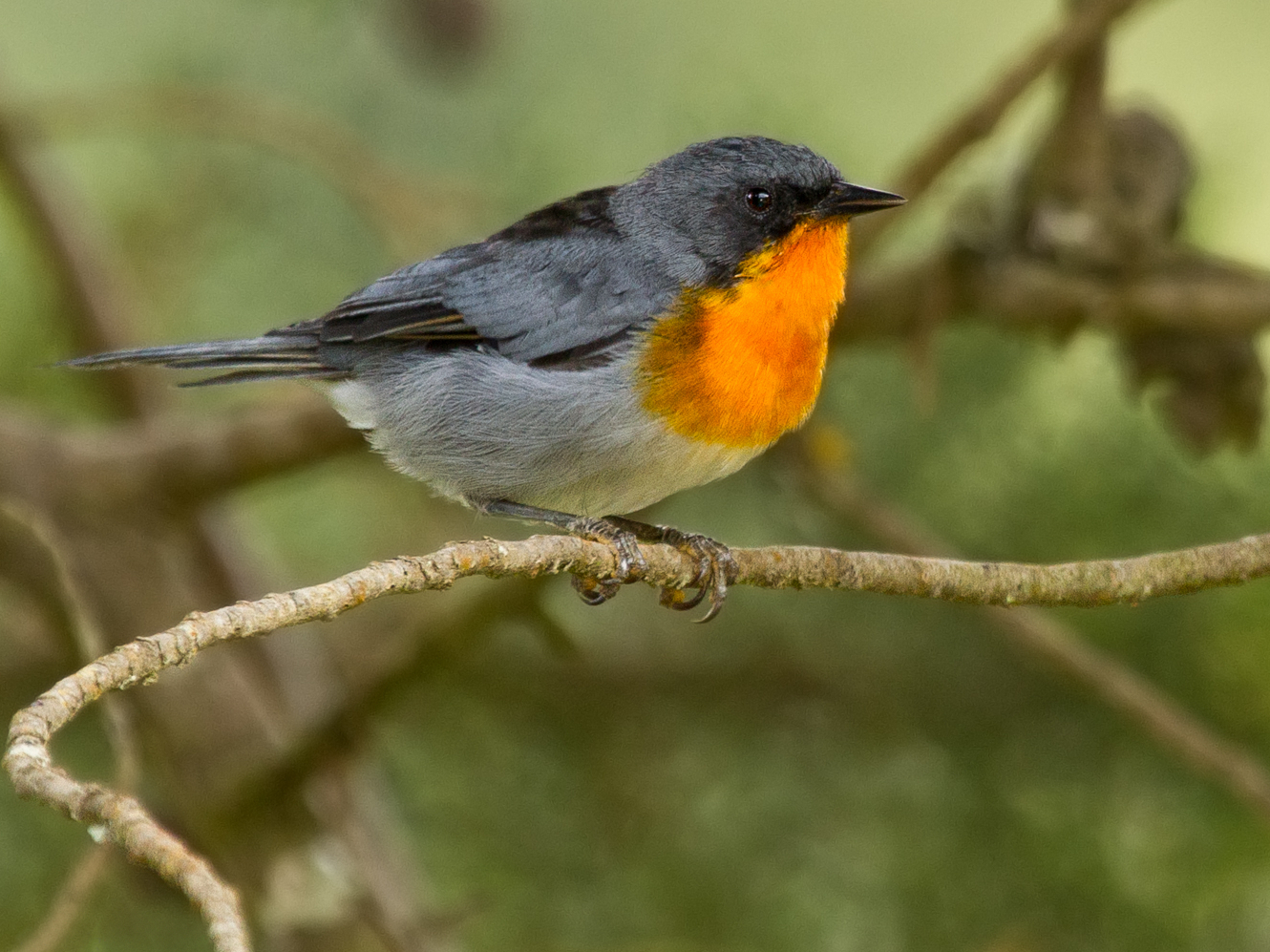

Conservation status
- Least Concern (IUCN 3.1)

Scientific classification
- Kingdom: Animalia
- Phylum: Chordata
- Class: Aves
- Order: Passeriformes
- Family: Parulidae
- Genus: Oreothlypis
- Species: O. gutturalis

Binomial name
- Oreothlypis gutturalis (Cabanis, 1861)
- Range of O. gutturalis

Synonyms
- Parula gutturalis; Vermivora gutturalis

= Flame-throated warbler =

Species of bird

The flame-throated warbler (Oreothlypis gutturalis) is a small New World warbler. It is sometimes placed in the genera Vermivora and Parula.

== Description ==
The adult flame-throated warbler is 12 cm (4.7 in) long and weighs 10 g (0.35 oz). It has slate grey upper parts, with black on the back, lores, and around the eye. It has a vermilion throat and breast which contrast with the whitish belly. The sexes are almost identical, but the black mask is more extensive in the male. The young bird is browner above, duller below, and has a weak buff eyestripe and wing bars.

The call of this warbler is a sharp chit. The song is a buzzing pi pipipipi shwaaaa.

== Distribution and habitat ==
This species is a resident breeder within the Talamancan montane forests of Costa Rica and western Panama, where it occurs in the canopy, woodland edges, and clearings with trees typically from 2,100 m (6,900 ft) up to the timberline. On the Caribbean slope in the wet season it may occur down to as low as 1,400 m (4,600 ft).

== Behaviour ==
The deep cup nest, always sheltered above by epiphytes or mosses, is built in a tree or on a low bank. Two white eggs are laid between March and May.

The flame-throated warbler feeds on caterpillars, insects and spiders picked off the foliage with its sharp pointed bill. It is territorial when breeding, but will join feeding flocks of insectivorous birds at other times.
