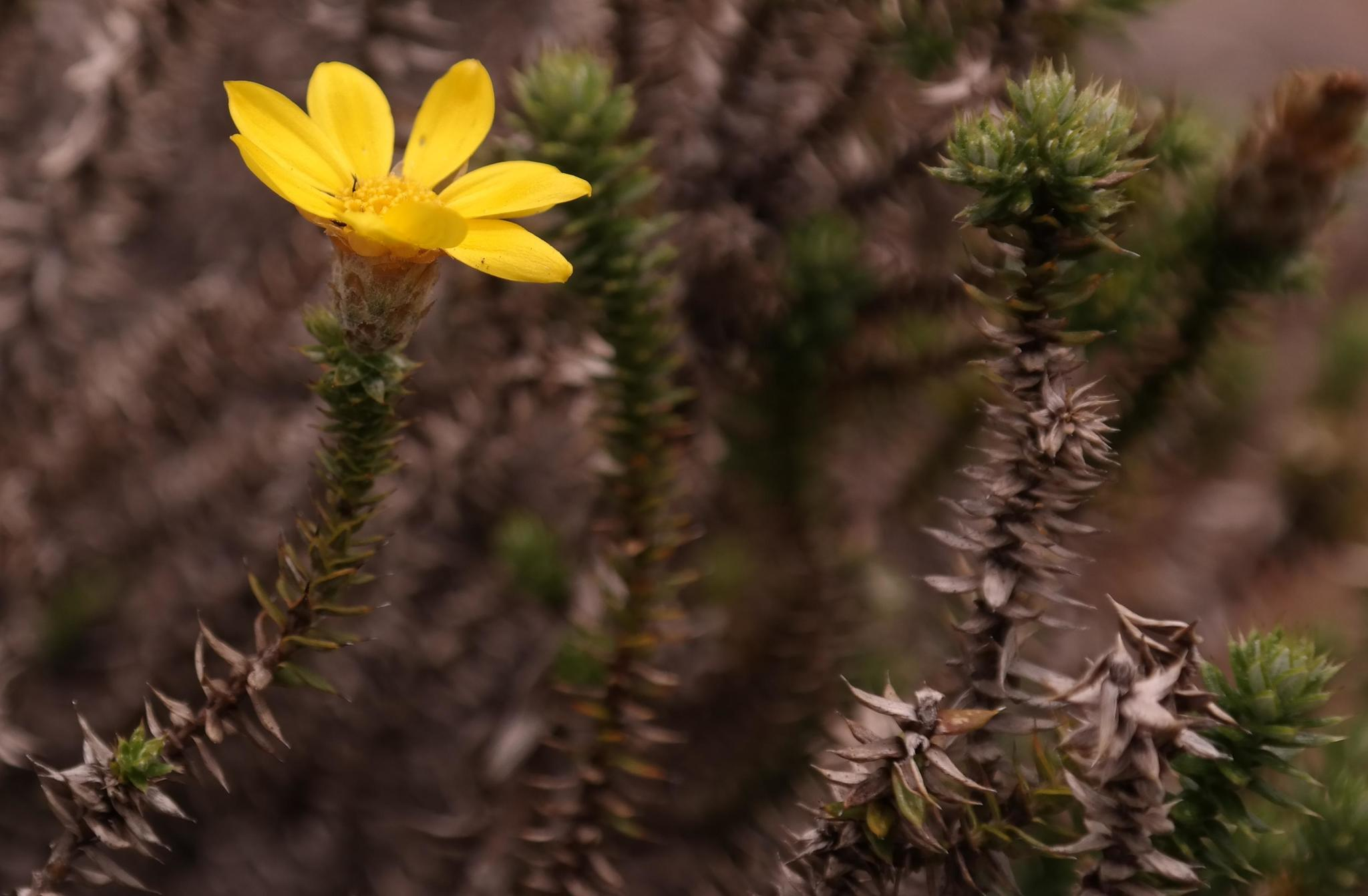
- Arrowsmithia styphelioides

Scientific classification
- Kingdom: Plantae
- Clade: Tracheophytes
- Clade: Angiosperms
- Clade: Eudicots
- Clade: Asterids
- Order: Asterales
- Family: Asteraceae
- Subfamily: Asteroideae
- Tribe: Gnaphalieae
- Genus: Arrowsmithia; DC.

Synonyms
- Homochaete Benth.; Klenzea Sch.Bip. ex Walp.; Macowania Oliv.

= Arrowsmithia =

Genus of flowering plants

Arrowsmithia is a genus of flowering plants in the family Asteraceae.

Species

Species accepted by the Plants of the World Online as of December 2022:

- Arrowsmithia abyssinica (Sch.Bip. ex Walp.) N.G.Bergh
- Arrowsmithia conferta (Benth.) N.G.Bergh
- Arrowsmithia corymbosa (M.D.Hend.) N.G.Bergh
- Arrowsmithia deflexa (Hilliard & B.L.Burtt) N.G.Bergh
- Arrowsmithia ericifolia (Forssk.) N.G.Bergh
- Arrowsmithia glandulosa (N.E.Br.) N.G.Bergh
- Arrowsmithia hamata (Hilliard & B.L.Burtt) N.G.Bergh
- Arrowsmithia pulvinaris (N.E.Br.) N.G.Bergh
- Arrowsmithia revoluta (Oliv.) N.G.Bergh
- Arrowsmithia sororis (Compton) N.G.Bergh
- Arrowsmithia styphelioides DC.
- Arrowsmithia tenuifolia (M.D.Hend.) N.G.Bergh
