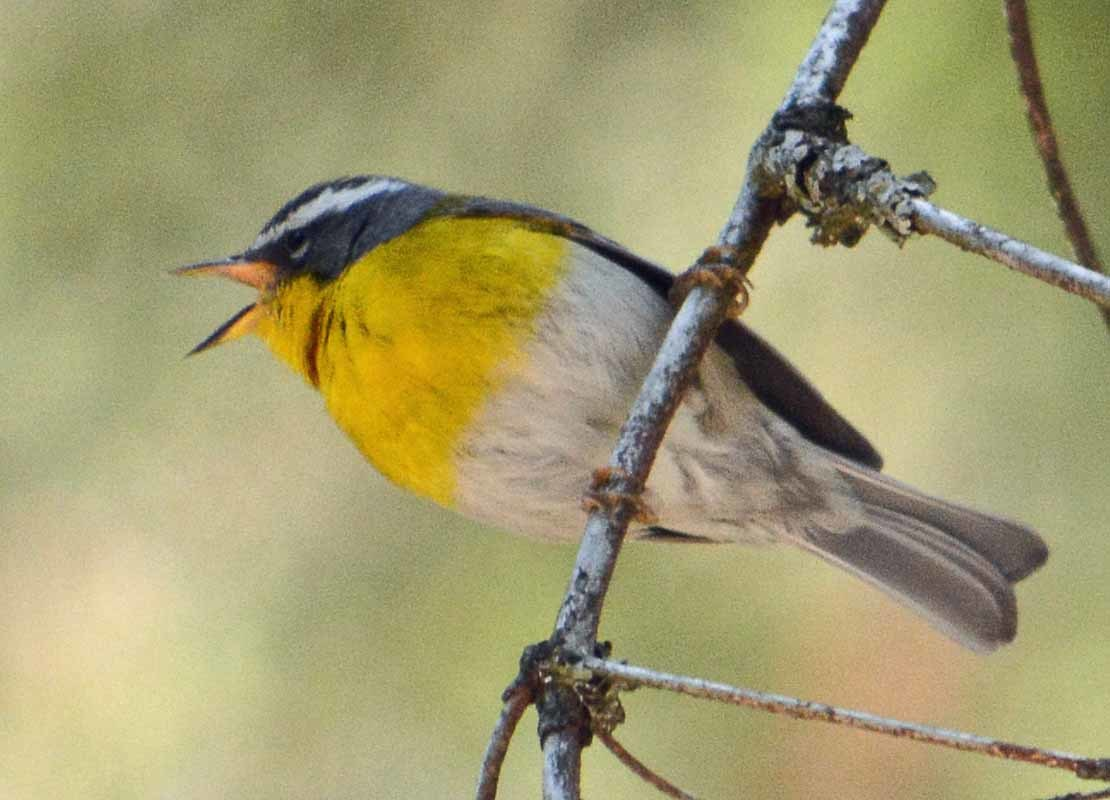
- Singing male

Conservation status
- Least Concern (IUCN 3.1)

Scientific classification
- Kingdom: Animalia
- Phylum: Chordata
- Class: Aves
- Order: Passeriformes
- Family: Parulidae
- Genus: Oreothlypis
- Species: O. superciliosa

Binomial name
- Oreothlypis superciliosa (Hartlaub, 1844)
- Range of O. superciliosa

Synonyms
- Parula superciliosa Vermivora superciliosa

= Crescent-chested warbler =

The crescent-chested warbler (Oreothlypis superciliosa) is a small New World warbler. It is common throughout its montane range, from northern Mexico to northern Nicaragua, and is an occasional vagrant to Arizona and Texas. It shows an affinity for oaks.

== Description ==
The crescent-chested warbler is superficially similar to both the northern parula and the tropical parula, with yellow underparts, a gray head, and a greenish back, but neither of these has a bold white eyebrow. Adult males have a discrete chestnut crescent on the breast, which is less prominent and sometimes lacking in females and young birds.

== Taxonomy ==
The species was formerly placed in the genus Parula, or Vermivora, but transferred to Oreothlypis following genetic analysis of the family Parulidae.

Five subspecies are accepted:

- Oreothlypis superciliosa sodalis (Moore, RT, 1941) — Sierra Madre Occidental of western Mexico
- Oreothlypis superciliosa mexicana (Bonaparte, CLJL, 1850) — Sierra Madre Oriental of eastern Mexico
- Oreothlypis superciliosa palliata (Van Rossem, AJ, 1939) — southwestern Mexico (southern Jalisco to western Michoacán and Guerrero)
- Oreothlypis superciliosa superciliosa (Hartlaub, KJG, 1844) — highlands of southern Mexico (Chiapas) to Guatemala and western Honduras
- Oreothlypis superciliosa parva (Miller, WD, & Griscom, L, 1925) — highlands of central and eastern Honduras and Nicaragua

== Movements ==
The species is largely sedentary, but northern populations may move south or to lower altitudes in winter. It is a rare vagrant in the United States, with records in southern Arizona and western Texas.

== Diet ==
These monogamous, solitary birds become more gregarious in winter, joining mixed-species flocks to feed, mostly on insects, but sometimes fruit and berries in the middle to upper levels of trees. It jumps from twigs and foliage, picking food from the underside of leaves, and hanging beneath leaves in a fashion similar to chickadees to check surfaces for prey.

== Breeding ==
Crescent-chested warblers make their nests atop grassy tussocks or sheltered by a hill or bank near the ground. Usually they will have 1 – 2 broods a year. The female is believed to build the nest without help from the male, gathering moss, grass, conifer needles, and fine materials to line the nest. She will then lay approximately three plain white eggs. Incubation is estimated to last 12 – 14 days by the female. The chicks are altricial and are also brooded by the female, and fed by both sexes. The young stay in the nest for an estimated 8–10 days. During this time, the female will exhibitions of distraction displays, acting as if she is injured, in order to lure off predators.
