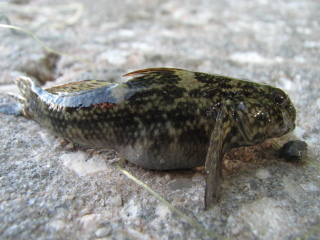

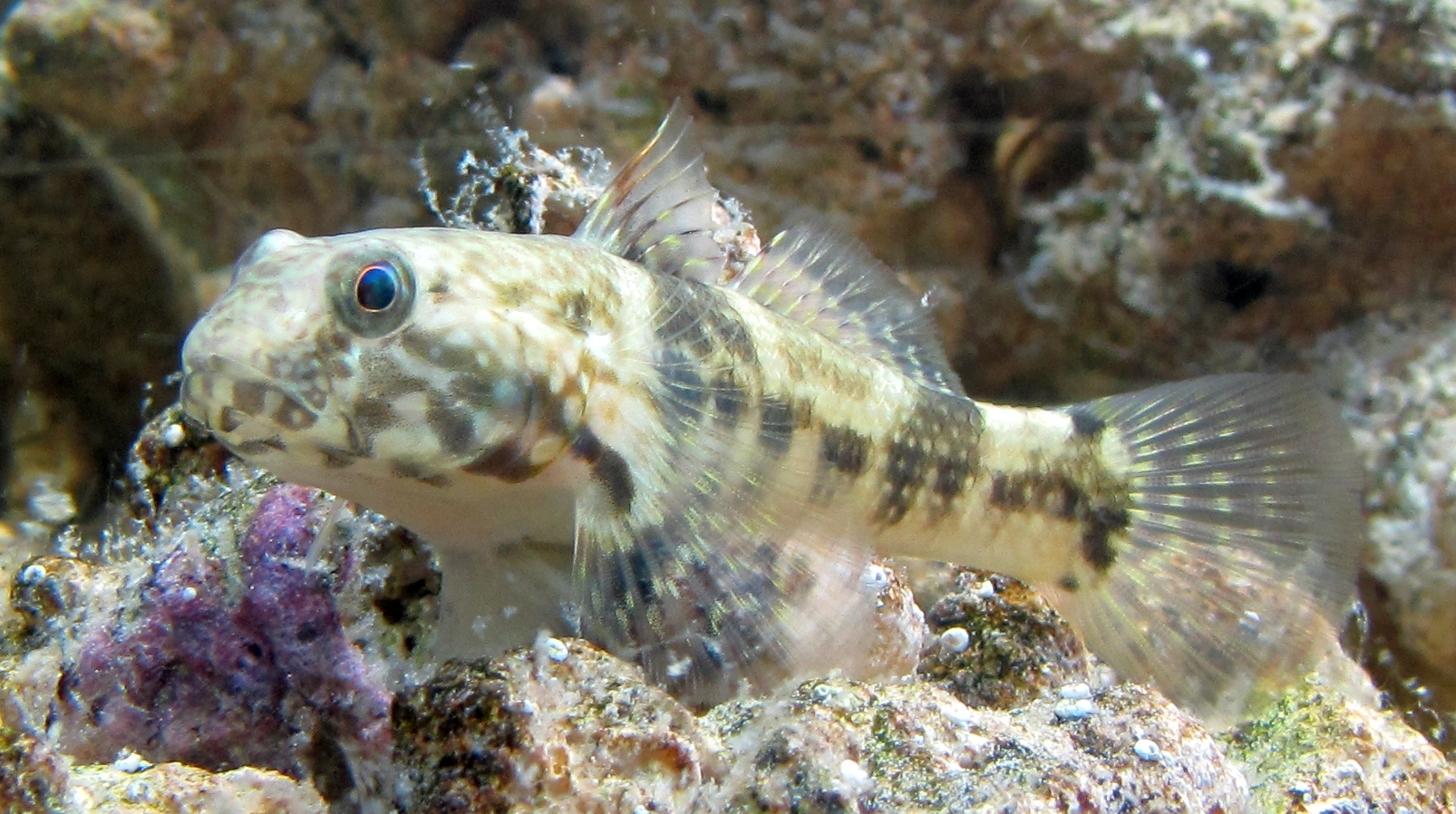

Conservation status
- Least Concern (IUCN 3.1)

Scientific classification
- Kingdom: Animalia
- Phylum: Chordata
- Class: Actinopterygii
- Order: Gobiiformes
- Family: Gobiidae
- Genus: Bathygobius
- Species: B. soporator

Binomial name
- Bathygobius soporator (Valenciennes, 1837)

Synonyms
- Bathygobius soprator (Valenciennes, 1837); Gobius humeralis Duméril, 1861; Gobius soporator Valenciennes, 1837; Mapo soporator (Valenciennes, 1837)

= Frillfin goby =

Species of fish

The frillfin goby (Bathygobius soporator) is a species of marine fish in the genus Bathygobius.

== Description ==
The frillfin goby is a usually dark colored goby with mottled coloring of black, gray, and tan, but body color is variable between habitats. It has a thin, gray-green first dorsal fin and a trailing second dorsal fin of the same color. Its brown eyes are proportionally large. Its cheeks are large. The caudal, anal, pectoral, and pelvic fins are a transparent yellow. The pelvic fins of the frillfin goby has one spine and five rays that are close together.

== Intelligence ==
The frillfin goby is capable of cognitive mapping: it can create a mental map of the typography of the intertidal zones around. This allows the fish to leap to a neighbouring pool without the risk of falling on the dry rock "doomed to die in the sun". We believed that such capacity of intelligence was exclusive to humans until discovered in rats in the late 1940s.

== Diet ==
The frillfin goby feeds on small crustaceans, like copepods, and small fishes like the tilapia fry. The frillfin can also feed on insects, detritus, bivalves, and gastropods.

== Habitat ==
Individuals are often found in tide pools, around mangrove trees, or in sheltered seagrass beds. The Frillfin goby can be found in marine, brackish, and even freshwater, and it can tolerate a wide range of salinities.

== Reproduction and lifecycle ==
The female goby lays her fertilized eggs on a hard, sheltered surface, such as the inside of an empty conch shell. The male can mate with several females, and each mate lays her eggs in a single location. The cluster is then protected by the male until the eggs hatch. These males are often extremely territorial, and chase off intruders. The young gobies can grow to an average of about 7.5 cm in length.

== Distribution ==
This species is found in the Gulf of Mexico. It prefers inshore shallows especially near rocks and pilings.

== Importance to humans ==
Although rare, the frillfin goby has been seen in the aquarium trade.
