= Olive tanager =

Olive tanager may refer to:

- Chlorothraupis frenata (yellow-lored tanager), native to South America; once treated as a subspecies (Chlorothraupis carmioli frenata) of Chlorothraupis carmioli
- Chlorothraupis carmioli (Carmiol's tanager), native to Central America and northwestern Colombia

== See also ==
- Chlorothraupis olivacea
