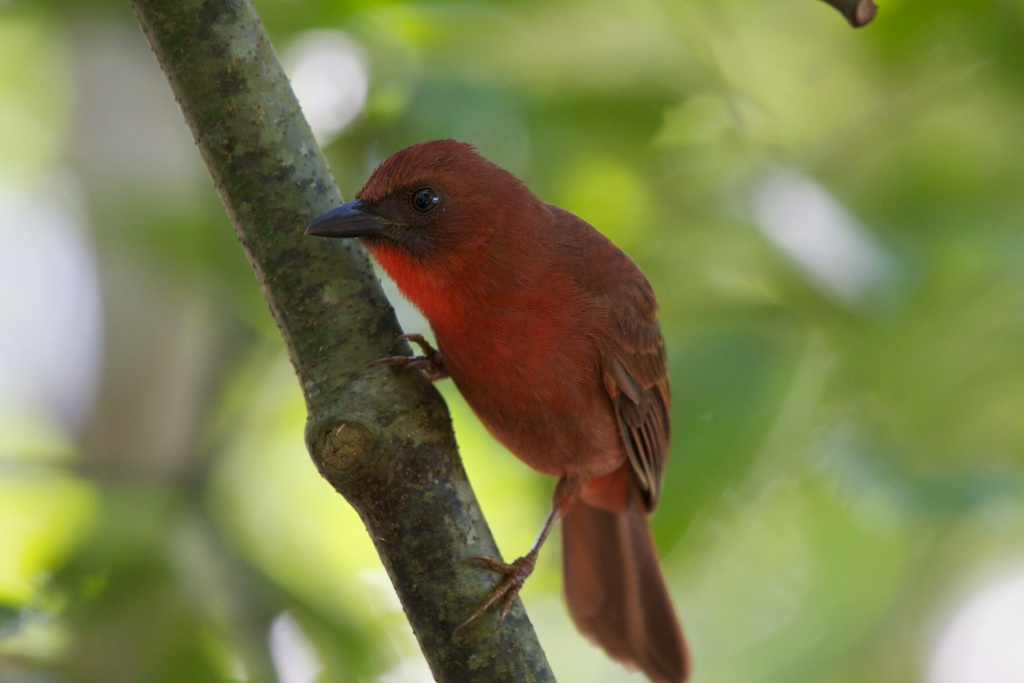
- Male in Belize
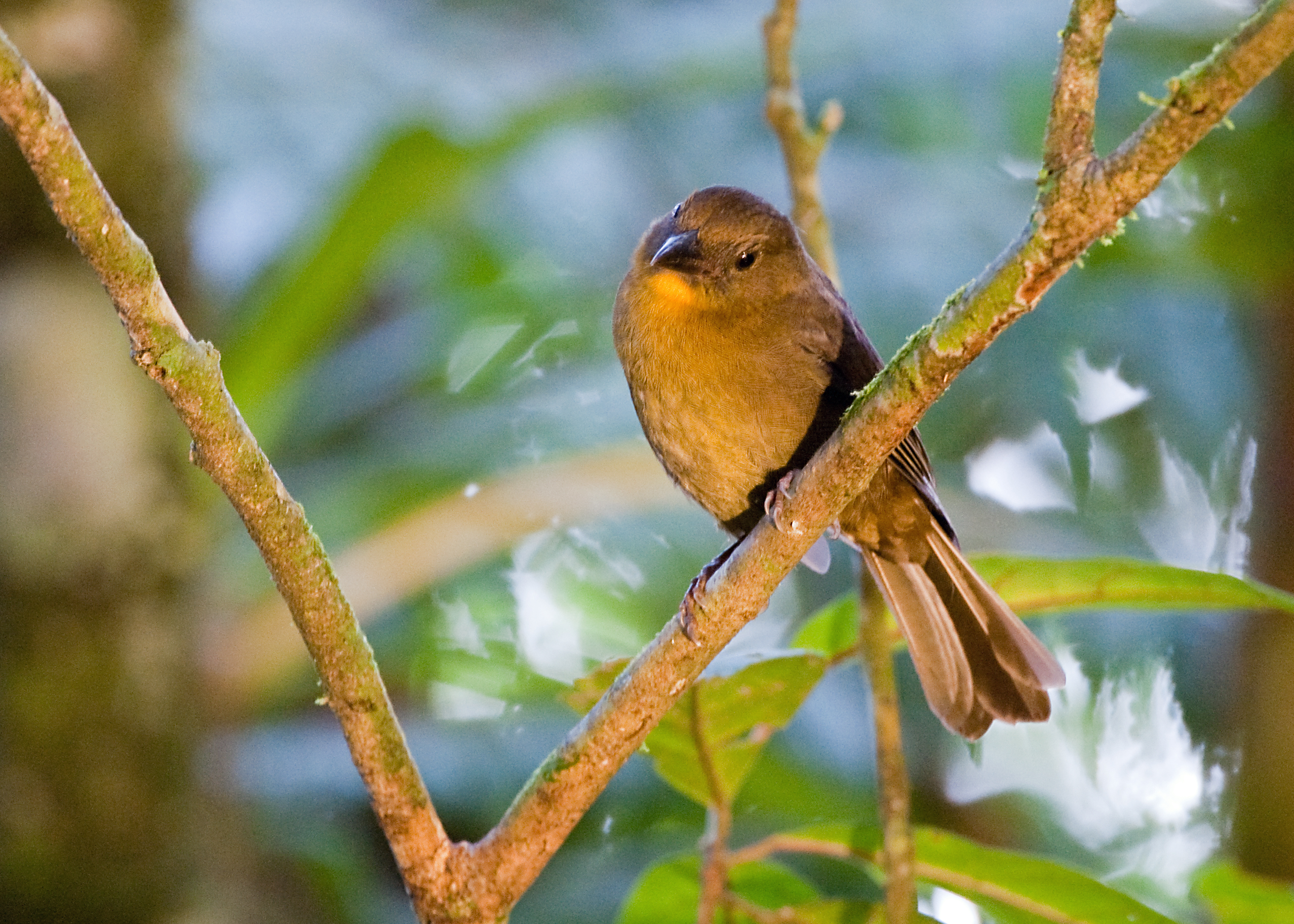
- Female in Costa Rica

Conservation status
- Least Concern (IUCN 3.1)

Scientific classification
- Kingdom: Animalia
- Phylum: Chordata
- Class: Aves
- Order: Passeriformes
- Family: Cardinalidae
- Genus: Driophlox
- Species: D. fuscicauda

Binomial name
- Driophlox fuscicauda (Cabanis, 1861)

= Red-throated ant tanager =

Species of bird

The red-throated ant tanager (Driophlox fuscicauda) is a species of bird in the family Cardinalidae, the cardinals, grosbeaks, and “tanager” allies. It is found from Mexico to Colombia.

== Taxonomy and systematics ==
The red-crowned ant tanager was formally described in 1861 with the binomial Phoenicothraupis fuscicauda.

The red-crowned ant tanager has a complicated taxonomic history. It was long placed in genus Habia and classified as a tanager in the family Thraupidae. Following a series of studies published in the early 2000s, beginning in 2009 taxonomic systems reclassified the genus as a member the family Cardinalidae. In 2024 most systems transferred the red-throated ant-tanager and three other species from Habia to the newly-erected genus Driophlox. However, as of late 2025 BirdLife International's Handbook of the Birds of the World retains them in Habia.

The systems agree that the red-throated ant tanager has these six subspecies:

- D. f. salvini (Berlepsch, 1883)
- D. f. insularis (Salvin, 1888)
- D. f. discolor (Ridgway, 1901)
- D. f. fuscicauda (Cabanis, 1861)
- D. f. willisi (Parkes, 1969)
- D. f. erythrolaema (Sclater, PL, 1862)

Some twentieth century authors treated the red-throated ant tanager and the sooty ant tanager (D. gutturalis) as conspecific, and several of the above subspecies were for a time assigned to the sooty ant tanager.

== Description ==
The red-throated ant tanager is 17 cm (6.7 in) to 19 cm (7.5 in) long. On average males weigh about 42 g (1.5 oz) and females 37 g (1.3 oz). The species is sexually dimorphic. Adult males of the nominate subspecies D. f. fuscicauda have a bright red or orange-red crown patch with narrow black edges and dusky cheeks on an otherwise dusky red face. Their upperparts are dusky red. Their wings are mostly dusky red with reddish-edged dusky primaries and dusky primary coverts. Their tail is also dusky with reddish feather edges. Their throat is bright red, their breast a less bright red, and their flanks and lower belly dusky gray. Adult females have a yellow crown patch and dusky cheeks on an olive-brown face. Their upperparts are olive-brown. Their wings are mostly olive-brown with dusky brown primary coverts. Their tail is dusky with olive-brown feather edges. Their throat is bright yellow and their underparts olive-brown. Both sexes have a dark brown iris and pinkish brown legs and feet. Males have a black bill and females a mostly black bill with some cream on the maxilla.

The other subspecies of the red-throated ant tanager differ from the nominate and each other thus:

- D. f. salvini: almost as dark as nominate
- D. f. insularis: palest subspecies; male has scarlet crown patch, brownish red upperparts, pale scarlet throat and undertail coverts, and red-tinged brownish gray breast and belly
- D. f. discolor: colors intermediate between nominate and salvini
- D. f. willisi: male has deeper richer red throat and somewhat less gray underparts than nominate; female has deeper yellow throat and darker belly than nominate
- D. f. erythrolaema: male intermediate between salvini and willisi; female somewhat paler than nominate

== Distribution and habitat ==
The red-throated ant-tanager has a disjunct distribution. The subspecies are found thus:

- D. f. salvini: from San Luis Potosí and southern Tamaulipas in northeastern Mexico south through central Guatemala, Belize, and northern Honduras; separately from western Chiapas in Mexico into southern Guatemala and from there spottily into El Salvador
- D. f. insularis: Mexico's Yucatán Peninsula and into northern Guatemala
- D. f. discolor: northern and eastern Nicaragua
- D. f. fuscicauda: from extreme southern Nicaragua through eastern Costa Rica into far western Panama
- D. f. willisi: Caribbean slope of Panama from Coclé and Colón provinces to Guna Yala (San Blas)
- D. f. erythrolaema: northern Colombia from northern Córdoba Department north to Atlántico Department

The red-throated ant tanager inhabits a wide variety of humid to semi-arid landscapes in the tropical and lower subtropical zones. They include evergreen and semideciduous forest, secondary forest, woodlands, and brushy areas. It favors thick undergrowth at the forest's edges rather than in its interior. Sources place its upper elevational limit at 1,200 m (3,900 ft), 1,250 m (4,100 ft), and 1,300 m (4,300 ft). Several agree that it is most common below 500 to 600 m (1,600 to 2,000 ft). It reaches 900 m (3,000 ft) in Costa Rica and only 200 m (700 ft) in its small Colombian range.

== Behavior ==
=== Movement ===
The red-throated ant tanager is a year-round resident.

=== Feeding ===
The red-throated ant tanager feeds primarily on insects, other arthropods, and fruit; it also includes small lizards in its diet. Fruits of figs (Ficus sp.), Cymbopetalum mayanum and Trophis racemosa have been noted. It typically forages in pairs or small groups and favors the forest understory though it will go higher in fruiting trees. It takes prey from foliage, bark, and leaf litter and sometimes in mid-air. In Mexico it frequently attends army ant swarms but has only occasionally been seen to do so in Panama.

=== Breeding ===
The red-throated ant tanager's breeding season has not been fully established but includes March and April in Panama and spans from April to August in Belize. Pairs and single birds defend territories throughout the year. Females build the nest from a wide variety of plant materials though dead leaves, vinelets, and epiphyte rootlets dominate the outer structure and fungal rhizomorphs the lining. Some are decorated with fungus-covered twigs. The clutch is two to four unspotted white eggs. Females alone incubate, for 12 to 14 days. Females brood nestlings and both parents provision them. Fledging occurs about 10 days after hatch and fledged young remain in their parents' territory for at least their first year.

=== Vocalization ===
One description of the male red-throated ant tanager's song is "a sweet, rising tee'tu-tee'tu-Tee'tu-tee'tu-tee". A description of its call is "a scratchy chueer-chueer-chet'chet'chet'Chet'Chet'chet'chet" that has been likened to the sound of shredding paper. Both sexes make gurgle notes, a growl call, a scack-ack-ack call, and wik notes.

== Status ==
The IUCN has assessed the red-throated ant tanager as being of Least Concern. It has a very large range; its estimated population of at least 500,000 mature individuals is believed to be decreasing. No immediate threats have been identified. It is considered fairly common in northern Central America and Costa Rica and locally common in Colombia. "Although the Red-throated Ant-Tanager lived in secondary forest and disturbed habitats, it is not known what their reproductive success is in these human modified habitats and how it may affect its social behavior."
