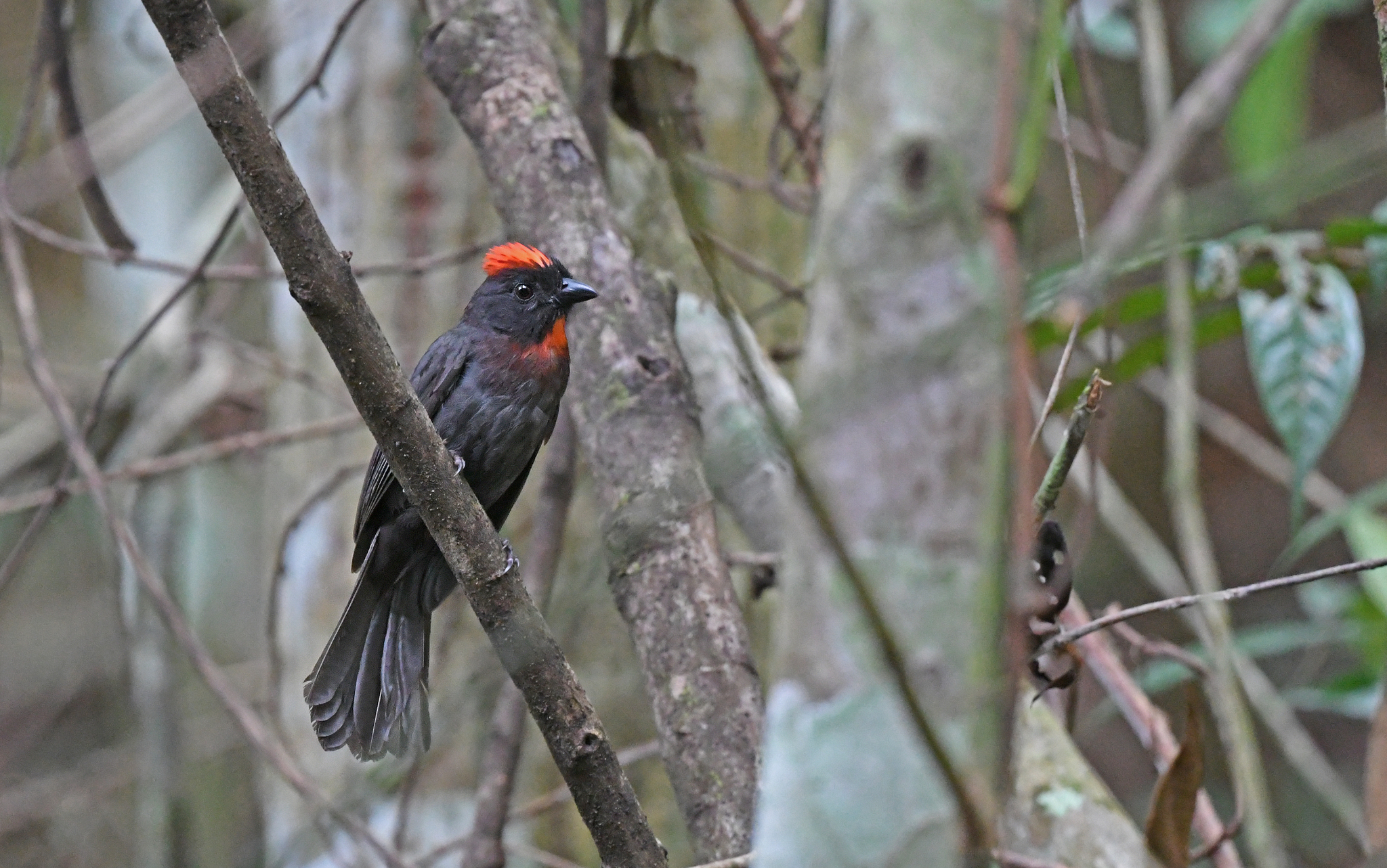
- Sooty ant tanager (Driophlox fuscicauda)

Scientific classification
- Kingdom: Animalia
- Phylum: Chordata
- Class: Aves
- Order: Passeriformes
- Family: Cardinalidae
- Genus: Driophlox; Scott, BF, Chesser, Unitt & Burns, KJ, 2024

Type species
- Phoenicothraupis gutturalis Sooty ant tanager Sclater, PL, 1854

= Driophlox =

Genus of birds

Driophlox is a genus of passerine birds in the family Cardinalidae. The four species placed in this genus were formerly placed with the red-crowned ant tanager in the genus Habia.

== Taxonomy ==
The species now placed in this genus were formerly placed with the red-crowned ant tanager in the genus Habia. Molecular phylogenetic analysis found that the genus Habia was paraphyletic. To resolve the paraphyly, four species were moved from Habia to a new genus Driophlox that was erected with Phoenicothraupis gutturalis Sclater, PL, 1854, (the sooty ant tanager) as the type species. The genus name combines the Ancient Greek δριος/drios meaning "thicket" or "copse" with φλοξ/phlox, φλογος/phlogos meaning "flame".

The genus contains the following four species:

Genus Driophlox – Scott, BF, Chesser, Unitt & Burns, KJ, 2024 – four species
Common name	Scientific name and subspecies	Range	Size and ecology	IUCN status and estimated population
Red-throated ant tanager Male Female	Driophlox fuscicauda (Cabanis, 1861) Six subspecies: D. f. salvini (Berlepsch, 1883); D. f. insularis (Salvin, 1888); D. f. discolor (Ridgway, 1901); D. f. fuscicauda (Cabanis, 1861); D. f. willisi (Parkes, 1969); D. f. erythrolaema (Sclater, PL, 1862)	eastern Mexico to northern Colombia	Size: Habitat: Diet:	LC
Black-cheeked ant tanager	Driophlox atrimaxillaris (Dwight & Griscom, 1924)	Costa Rica	Size: Habitat: Diet:	NT
Sooty ant tanager Male	Driophlox gutturalis (Sclater, PL, 1854)	Colombia	Size: Habitat: Diet:	LC
Crested ant tanager	Driophlox cristata (Lawrence, 1875)	Colombia	Size: Habitat: Diet:	LC
