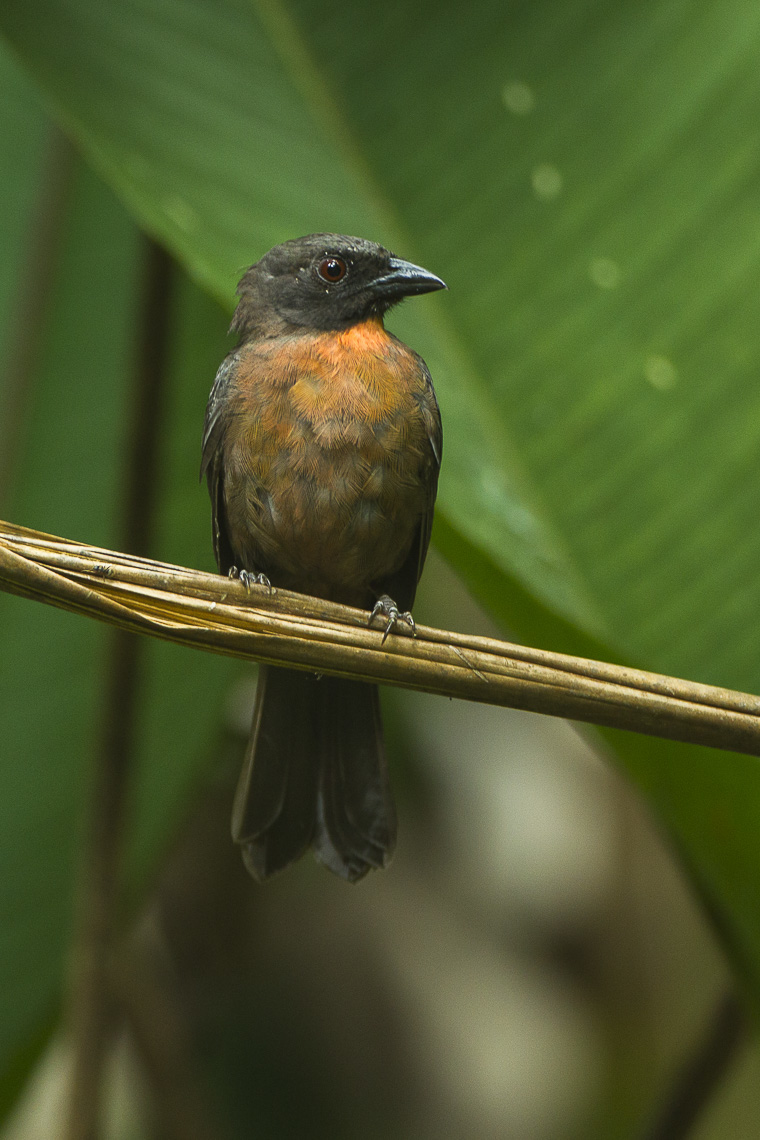

Conservation status
- Near Threatened (IUCN 3.1)

Scientific classification
- Kingdom: Animalia
- Phylum: Chordata
- Class: Aves
- Order: Passeriformes
- Family: Cardinalidae
- Genus: Driophlox
- Species: D. atrimaxillaris

Binomial name
- Driophlox atrimaxillaris (Dwight & Griscom, 1924)

= Black-cheeked ant tanager =

Species of bird

The black-cheeked ant tanager (Driophlox atrimaxillaris) is a species of bird in the family Cardinalidae. It is endemic to Costa Rica. It was formerly placed with the red-crowned ant tanager in the genus Habia.

== Taxonomy and systematics ==
The original description of the black-cheeked ant tanager assigned it the binomial Phoenicothraupis atrimaxillaris and placed it in family Thraupidae, the "true" tanagers. Genus Habia was later shown to have priority so the species was renamed to its current binomial. In the early 2000s, DNA analysis revealed that all the members of Habia were more closely related to the cardinals, so they were moved to family Cardinalidae.

== Description ==
Based on a small number of specimens, the black-cheeked ant tanager is 18 to 19 cm (7.1 to 7.5 in) long and weighs 36.2 to 48.9 g (1.28 to 1.72 oz). The male's upper parts are dark gray with a red tinge, and it has a (usually invisible) orange-red crest. The face has a diffuse black "mask". The throat is bright salmon orange that transitions through darker salmon to dark gray with a pink tinge on the belly. The female is similar but duller and its crest is smaller.

== Distribution and habitat ==
The black-cheeked ant tanager is found only on Costa Rica's Osa Peninsula and the adjoining eastern shore of Golfo Dulce. (One wandering individual was captured more than 70 km (43 mi) inland.) It inhabits well-developed understorey in lowland forest, riparian woodlands, and older secondary forest. It stays in the forest interior and shuns edges and open habitat. In elevation it ranges up to approximately 300 m (980 ft).

== Behavior ==
=== Feeding ===
The black-cheeked ant tanager is primarily insectivorous, though it also eats fruits and small vertebrates.

=== Breeding ===
The black-cheeked ant tanager has been documented nesting between January and March. It builds an open cup nest fairly low in understorey vegetation. All known clutches were of two eggs. The species appears to nest cooperatively, as three adults have been documented attending nestlings.

=== Vocalization ===
The black-cheeked ant tanager's dawn song has been variously described as "whistled phrases...chonk TWEEah, chonk TWEEah" and a "clear, mellow, whistled tu-see, tu-see or tu-seeur tu-swee tu-seeur" . It has a variety of calls such as and .

== Status ==
The IUCN has assessed the black-cheeked ant tanager as near threatened "because of its small range which is mostly confined to two protected areas." "The primary threat to [the species] is ongoing fragmentation of lowland forest".
