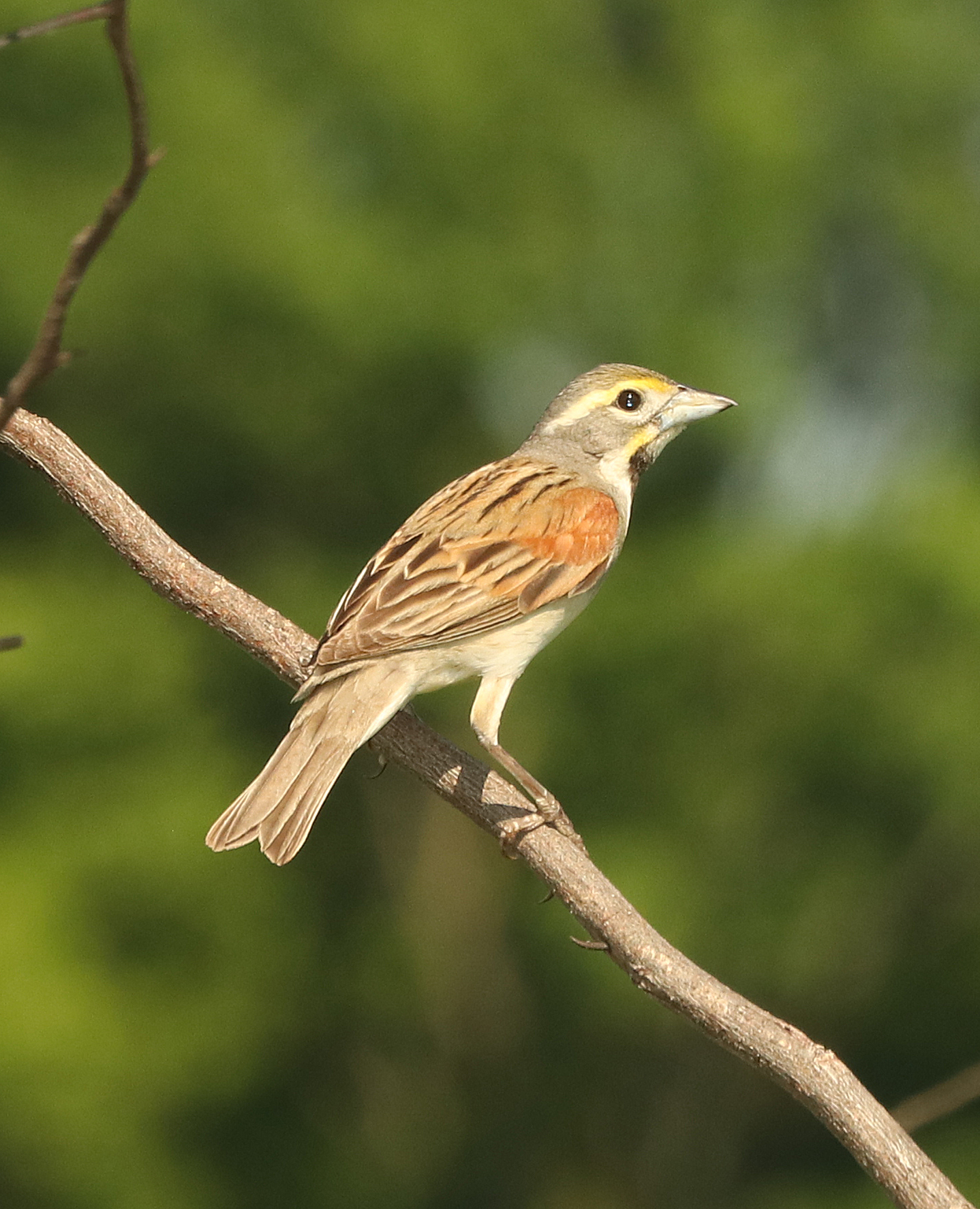
- Male in breeding plumage
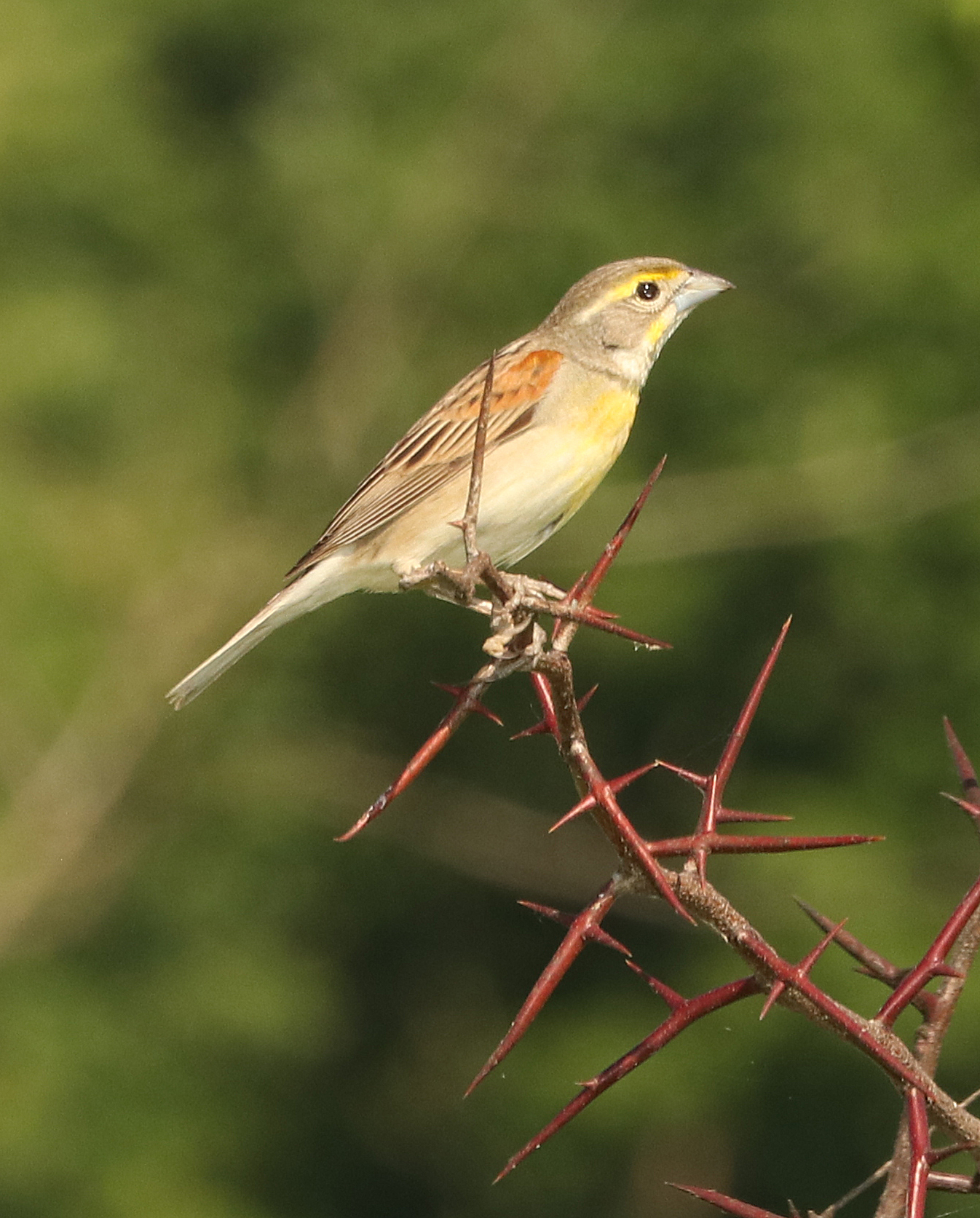
- Female Song

Conservation status
- Least Concern (IUCN 3.1)

Scientific classification
- Kingdom: Animalia
- Phylum: Chordata
- Class: Aves
- Order: Passeriformes
- Family: Cardinalidae
- Genus: Spiza; Bonaparte, 1824
- Species: S. americana

Binomial name
- Spiza americana (Gmelin, 1789)
- Breeding Breeding (scarce) Migration Nonbreeding Nonbreeding (scarce)

Synonyms
- Emberiza townsendi Emberiza townsendii (lapsus); Spiza townsendi Spiza townsendii (lapsus) (see text)

= Dickcissel =

Species of bird

The dickcissel (Spiza americana) is a small seed-eating migratory bird in the family Cardinalidae. It breeds on the prairie grasslands of the Midwestern United States and winters in Central America, northern Colombia, and northern Venezuela. It is the only member of the genus Spiza, though some sources list another supposedly extinct species.

== Taxonomy ==
The dickcissel was formally described in 1789 by German naturalist Johann Friedrich Gmelin under the binomial name Emberiza americana. Gmelin based his account on the "black-throated bunting" that the Welsh naturalist Thomas Pennant had described and illustrated in 1785 in his Arctic Zoology. The dickcissel is now the only species placed in the genus Spiza that was introduced in 1824 by French naturalist Charles Lucien Bonaparte. The genus name Spiza is the Ancient Greek word for a common type of finch, now assumed to be a chaffinch. The species is monotypic; no subspecies are recognised.

The dickcissel is part of a group of the Cardinalidae that also includes Amaurospiza, Cyanocompsa, Cyanoloxia, and Passerina. Spiza is the only one among these that lacks blue structural colors in its plumage. Though the color pattern and habits of the dickcissel make it stand apart from other Cardinalidae, its robust, cone-shaped bill – stouter than in American sparrows or true finches, which it somewhat resembles at first glance – gives away its relationships.

=== "Townsend's dickcissel" ===
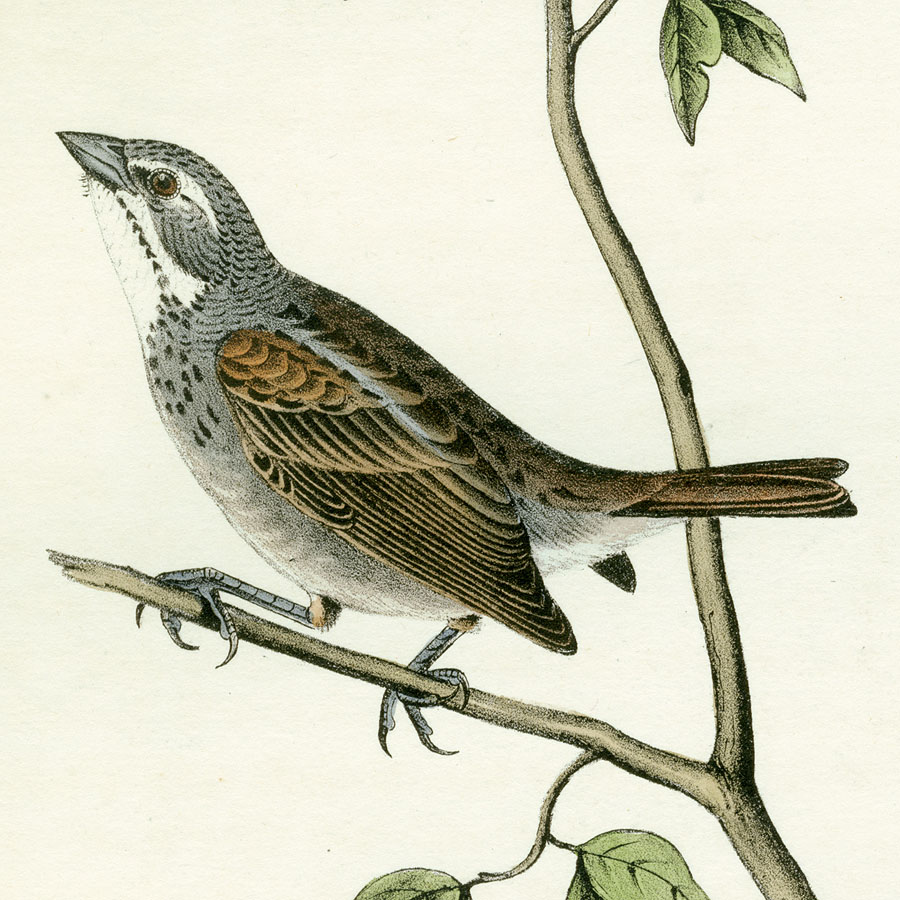
Lithograph of "Townsend's Bunting"

A problematic specimen is often discussed under the name of Spiza townsendi (or Spiza townsendii, the original misspelt specific name proposed by John James Audubon). This individual was collected on May 11, 1833, by Audubon's colleague John Kirk Townsend in New Garden Township, Chester County, Pennsylvania. The specimen remains unique and nothing is known about what it represents with certainty; it had thus even been suggested to be an extinct relative. In 2014, Kyle Blaney photographed the bird in Ontario, proving its continuing existence.

It is commonly called "Townsend's dickcissel" (or "Townsend's bunting", "Townsend's finch") in reference to the collector whom the scientific name honors. Rather than a distinct species or subspecies, it is (as certainly as this can be said in absence of direct proof) a color variant. Comparing the birds, it is immediately obvious that the yellow lipochrome pigments are entirely absent in "Townsend's dickcissel". The specimen has foxed today, giving it an altogether beige hue, but when originally shot, the olive areas of the head were grey as the cheeks, and the yellow and buff on face and underside was pure white. The brown wings and tail were rufous, due to the pheomelanins not being tinged by lipochromes.

Thus, this bird is very likely the result of a simple genetic change, perhaps just a single point mutation, affecting some part of the carotinoid metabolism – essentially the same thing that happens in albinism, but in a different metabolic pathway. Though the bird seemed to be healthy and had survived to maturity when it found its untimely end through Townsend's gun, no other such specimens have been documented before, nor ever since. Albinism and other pigment aberrations are not infrequently seen in birds, and the lack of further specimens is somewhat puzzling in that respect.

No specific details are known about the dickcissel's lipochrome metabolism; it may be more fine-tuned than in other birds, so that most mutations therein will be lethal and Audubon's bird was simply one of the very few individuals that survived. In wild birds, varying from species to species, some color aberrations are less frequently seen than others, and in captive birds such as canaries, some color mutations have only arisen a handful of times at most during several centuries of dedicated breeding and screening for novel color variants (see also Budgerigar colour genetics). While only a complete molecular biological study of the dickcissel's metabolism and the specimen's ancient DNA stands any reasonable chance to resolve the question with certainty, the hypothesis of an extremely uncommon color mutation is plausible, and such phenomena certainly occur in other Passeroidea.

Alternatively, the bird was considered a hybrid, but the present state of knowledge of the dickcissel's relations makes this not very plausible; a number of species exist with which Spiza could conceivably produce hybrids, such as Passerina, but the lack of even the slightest hint of blue structural colors in Townsend's specimen and it moreover being not different from a dickcissel in habitus makes the hybrid theory suspect. Regardless, Townsend observed the bird making vocalizations reminiscent more of an indigo bunting (Passerina cyanea), and by comparing mitochondrial and nuclear DNA sequences of the specimen with those of the dickcissel, the indigo bunting, and perhaps other Passerina, the hybridization hypothesis should be far more easy to prove or reject than a color aberration. On the other hand, not enough is known on whether dickcissels pick up their characteristic vocalizations from conspecific males or whether they are innate, thus no firm conclusion regarding Townsend's observations has been made.

== Description ==
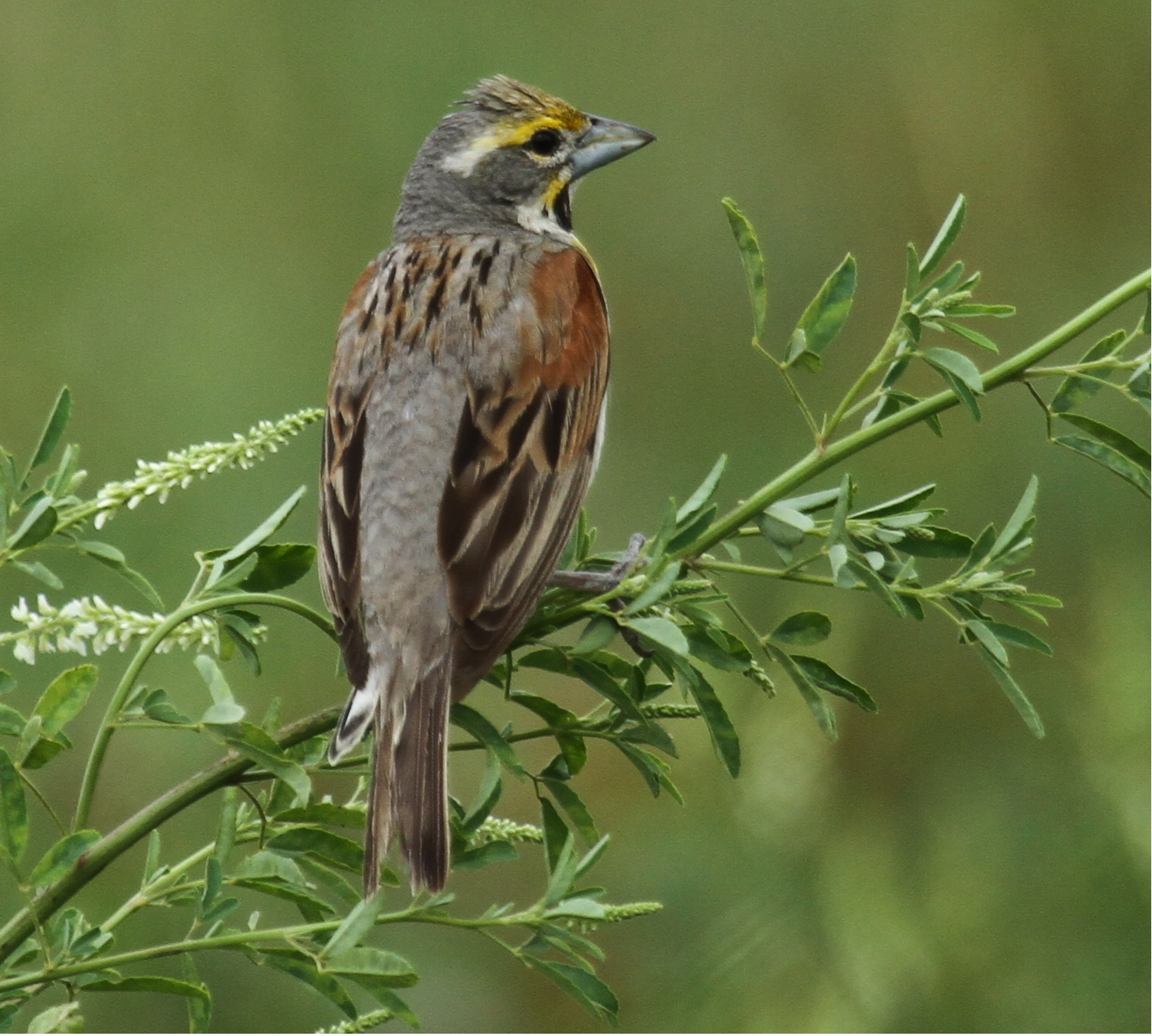
Male in nonbreeding plumage - Maywood, Illinois

Their length is 5.5–6.3 in (140–160 mm), wingspan is 9.8–10.2 in (250–260 mm), and weight is0.9–1.4 oz (26–40 g). Dickcissels have a large, pale bill, a yellow line over the eyes, brownish upperparts with black streaks on the back, dark wings, a rust patch on the shoulders, and light underparts. Adult males have a black throat patch, a yellow breast, and grey cheeks and crown. This head and breast pattern is especially brilliant in the breeding plumage, making it resemble an eastern meadowlark. Females and juveniles are brownish on the cheeks and crown, and are somewhat similar in appearance to house sparrows; they have streaked flanks.

In flight, they make a low, "electric", buzzing fpppt. From an open perch in a field, this bird's song is a sharp dick dick followed by a buzzed cissel, also transcribed as skee-dlees chis chis chis or dick dick ciss ciss ciss.

== Distribution and habitat ==
The dickcissel's breeding habitat is fields in midwestern North America. In the early 1800s, the species spread eastward from the tallgrass prairies, but after 1850, its range decreased, and it eventually disappeared as a regular breeding bird along the East Coast. Following the breeding season the species migrates in large flocks to southern Mexico, Central America, and northern South America. They may occur as vagrants well outside of their normal range. From 1966 to 2015 the dickcissel experienced a greater than 1.5% population reduction in the northern part of its breeding range and throughout the Midwestern United States.

== Behaviour and ecology ==
=== Breeding ===
The birds migrate to their breeding range rather late, with the first arriving only in May, with most birds only arriving in early June. They nest near the ground in dense grasses or small shrubs, or up to 3–4 ft (91–122 cm) high in bushes and trees. Males may have up to six mates, with most attracting only one or two, and several failing to attract any mates at all. Yet if such "bachelors" survive until the next summer, they will get another try to attract females, as the partners only stay together for raising one brood. Dickcissels are thus among the few songbirds that are truly polygynous. When they leave for winter quarters by early August or so, what little pair bond existed during the summer is broken up.

=== Feeding ===
Dickcissels forage on the ground or in fields. They mainly eat insects and seeds. Outside of the nesting season, they usually feed in flocks. They are considered a pest by farmers in some regions because flocks can consume large quantities of cultivated grains.

Dickcissel populations frequently fluctuate in numbers, even to the extent that their range changes notably. In the early 19th century, dickcissels expanded eastward, establishing a population in New England and the mid-Atlantic states that disappeared around the end of the century. Both appearance and disappearance were probably related to changes in land use.
