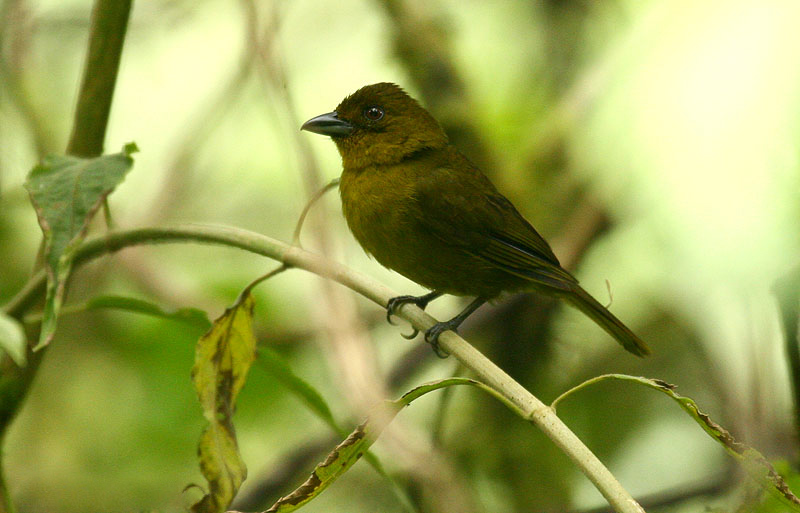

Scientific classification
- Kingdom: Animalia
- Phylum: Chordata
- Class: Aves
- Order: Passeriformes
- Family: Cardinalidae
- Genus: Chlorothraupis; Salvin & Godman, 1883

Type species
- Phoenicothraupis carmioli Lawrence, 1868

= Chlorothraupis =

Genus of birds

Chlorothraupis is a genus of bird in the family Cardinalidae. It was long considered to be a member of the tanager family (Thraupidae), as their common names suggest, but this is false. They are close relatives of the genus Habia, the "ant-tanagers".

== Species ==
The genus contains the following four species:

Genus Chlorothraupis – Salvin & Godman, 1883 – four species
Common name	Scientific name and subspecies	Range	Size and ecology	IUCN status and estimated population
Carmiol's tanager	Chlorothraupis carmioli (Lawrence, 1868) Three subspecies: C. c. carmioli (Lawrence, 1868); C. c. magnirostris Griscom, 1927; C. c. lutescens Griscom, 1927	Nicaragua, Costa Rica, Panama and far north-western Colombia	Size: Habitat: Diet:	LC
Yellow-lored tanager	Chlorothraupis frenata (Berlepsch, 1907)	Colombia, Peru, Bolivia	Size: Habitat: Diet:	LC
Lemon-spectacled tanager	Chlorothraupis olivacea (Cassin, 1860)	Colombia, Ecuador, and Panama	Size: Habitat: Diet:	LC
Ochre-breasted tanager	Chlorothraupis stolzmanni (Berlepsch & Taczanowski, 1884)	Colombia and Ecuador	Size: Habitat: Diet:	LC
