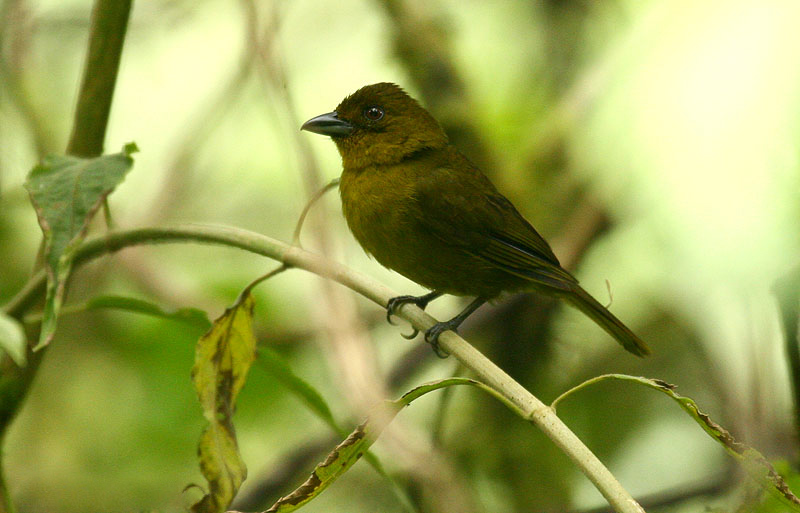

Conservation status
- Least Concern (IUCN 3.1)

Scientific classification
- Kingdom: Animalia
- Phylum: Chordata
- Class: Aves
- Order: Passeriformes
- Family: Cardinalidae
- Genus: Chlorothraupis
- Species: C. carmioli

Binomial name
- Chlorothraupis carmioli (Lawrence, 1868)
- Approximate range

= Carmiol's tanager =

Species of bird

Carmiol's tanager (Chlorothraupis carmioli) is a species of bird in the cardinal family Cardinalidae that is found in Central America from Nicaragua southwards to northwest Colombia. Its natural habitats are subtropical or tropical moist lowland forests and heavily degraded former forest. It was formerly considered as conspecific with the yellow-lored tanager.

== Taxonomy ==
Carmiol's tanager was formally described in 1868 by the American ornithologist George Newbold Lawrence from a specimen collected in Costa Rica. He coined the binomial name Phoenicothraupis carmioli. Carmiol's tanager is now one of four species placed in the genus Chlorothraupis that was introduced in 1863 by Osbert Salvin and Frederick DuCane Godman. The common name and the specific epithet commemorate Franz Carmiol, the son of a German immigrant to Nicaragua, who had collected the specimen for the Smithsonian Institution. The genus was at one time placed in the tanager family Thraupidae but was moved to the cardinal family Cardinalidae based on molecular evidence. Carmiol's tanager was formerly treated as conspecific with the yellow-lored tanager (Chlorothraupis frenata).

Three subspecies are recognised:

- C. c. carmioli (Lawrence, 1868) – Nicaragua to northwest Panama
- C. c. magnirostris Griscom, 1927 – west Panama
- C. c. lutescens Griscom, 1927 – central Panama to northwest Colombia

== Description ==
The adult Carmiol's tanager is about 17 cm (6.7 in) long and is an evenly coloured, robust bird. The upper parts are a dull olive green, and the underparts are a rather paler olive green. The throat is slightly yellower than the rest of the underparts, and is streaked in the male while being a uniform pale yellow in the female. The underparts of the female are paler than those of the male, and the female has a yellowish patch in front of the eyes. The beak is relatively stout and is dark-coloured in both sexes. The lemon-spectacled tanager looks similar, apart from its yellow facial markings, but does not share the same range as the olive tanager. Also similar is the ochre-breasted tanager (Chlorothraupis stolzmanni) but again the ranges do not overlap.

== Ecology ==
Carmiol's tanager is a gregarious bird and often forms noisy groups of a few dozen birds, sometimes including birds of other species such as the tawny-crested tanager (Tachyphonus delatrii). In Panama a typical call is a repeated "zhwek-zhwek-zhwek", this being repeated several times before going on to a different phrase.

It feeds on small insects such as beetles, cockroaches and crickets, supplementing these with berries. Breeding takes place between March and May and the nest is a cup-shaped construction of plant fibres and mosses.

== Status ==
The population of this bird has not been quantified but the total number of birds is thought to be declining. However, the bird is common in some areas, and the International Union for Conservation of Nature considers its conservation status to be of "least concern".
