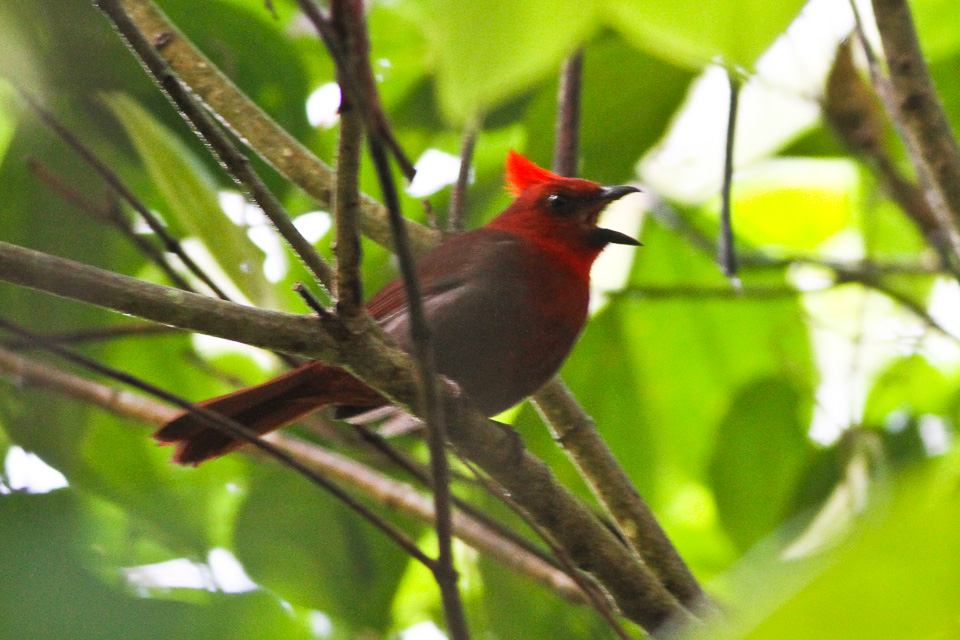

Conservation status
- Least Concern (IUCN 3.1)

Scientific classification
- Kingdom: Animalia
- Phylum: Chordata
- Class: Aves
- Order: Passeriformes
- Family: Cardinalidae
- Genus: Driophlox
- Species: D. cristata

Binomial name
- Driophlox cristata (Lawrence, 1875)

= Crested ant tanager =

Species of bird

The crested ant tanager (Driophlox cristata) is a bird in the family Cardinalidae that is endemic to Colombia. It was formerly placed with the red-crowned ant tanager in the genus Habia.

== Taxonomy and systematics ==
The crested ant tanager was originally placed in family Thraupidae, the "true" tanagers. In the early 2000s, DNA analysis revealed that all the members of Habia were more closely related to the cardinals, so they were moved to family Cardinalidae. The crested ant tanager is monotypic.

== Description ==
The crested ant tanager is approximately 19 cm (7.5 in) long. The male's head is dusky red with a prominent scarlet crest. The rest of the upper parts fade from red on the shoulders through dark crimson to brownish red at the rump. The throat and chest are bright red and the rest of the underparts gray, some with a red tinge. The female is similar though duller and with less gray, and its crest is smaller. The immature does not have a crest; it is reddish brown above and cinnamon below.

== Distribution and habitat ==
The crested ant tanager is found on both slopes of Colombia's Western Andes, from Antioquia Department south to Cerro Munchique in Cauca Department, and on both slopes of the Central Andes from Antioquia to Tolima Department. It inhabits the understorey of humid mid-level and montane forest. It favors dense vegetation, especially along streams, around openings such as landslides, and in ravines. It is occasionally found in more open areas. In elevation it ranges from 700 to 2,000 m (2,300 to 6,600 ft).

== Behavior ==
=== Feeding ===
The crested ant-tanager's diet is mostly insects and other arthropods, but it also eats palm seeds and other fruits. It forages through the undergrowth in pairs or small groups and sometimes sallies out to catch flying insects. Groups have been observed following army ant swarms.

=== Breeding ===
One crested ant-tanager was observed carrying nesting material in a ravine in June; it was accompanied by two others. No other information on its breeding phenology has been published.

=== Vocalization ===
The crested ant-tanager's dawn song is repeated "che'ik" notes . It mobs with a "loud, shrill 'Chi-veek!'" .

== Status ==
The IUCN has assessed the crested ant-tanager as being of Least Concern. It occurs in several protected areas, but "numbers are undoubtedly declining; it has experienced considerable range contraction and fragmentation because of deforestation, and should probably be regarded as being at risk in the near future."
