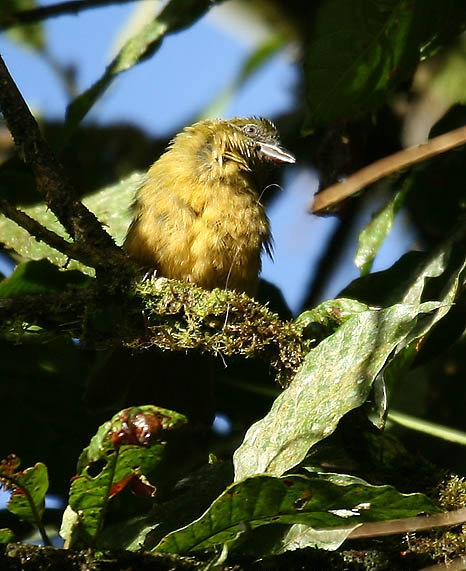

Conservation status
- Least Concern (IUCN 3.1)

Scientific classification
- Kingdom: Animalia
- Phylum: Chordata
- Class: Aves
- Order: Passeriformes
- Family: Cardinalidae
- Genus: Chlorothraupis
- Species: C. stolzmanni

Binomial name
- Chlorothraupis stolzmanni (Berlepsch & Taczanowski, 1884)
- Approximate range

= Ochre-breasted tanager =

Species of bird

The ochre-breasted tanager (Chlorothraupis stolzmanni) is a species of bird in the family Cardinalidae. It is found in Colombia and Ecuador where its natural habitats are subtropical or tropical moist lowland forests and subtropical or tropical moist montane forests. As a fairly common species with a stable population, the International Union for Conservation of Nature has rated this bird as being of "least concern".

== Description ==
The ochre-breasted tanager grows to a length of about 18 cm (7 in). The sexes are similar in appearance, the upper parts being drab olive-green. Birds in Colombia show a slight grey shading on the head. The iris of the eye is pale bluish-grey. The underparts are ochraceous buff, with some olive shading on the flanks and breast, the throat being the palest region. It is similar in appearance to the lemon-spectacled tanager and the olive tanager but the three species do not share common ranges; the lemon-spectacled tanager is native to western Colombia and northwestern Ecuador, the ochre-breasted tanager occurs at higher elevations, and the olive tanager occurs further south in the eastern foothills of the Andes in southern Colombia, Peru and Bolivia, with a disjunct population in Central America.

== Distribution and habitat ==
This species is native to South America. Its range extends on the western slopes of the Andes from the Chocó Department of Colombia southwards to the El Oro Province of Ecuador. It usually occurs between 400 and 1,500 m (1,300 and 4,900 ft) and is locally common in moist forest. It normally occurs at higher altitudes than the closely related lemon-spectacled tanager (Chlorothraupis olivacea) and can be told from that species by its brown-tinged underparts and its lack of a yellow ring round the eye.

== Ecology ==
The diet consists mostly of fruit, flowers and insects. It forms small groups of up to a dozen or so birds which move noisily through the understorey of the forest, chattering loudly as they go. Sometimes they form small mixed flocks with other species. One or more birds may sing in the early morning, each perched in a prominent position, emitting loud, raucous noises, often in concert with other members of the group.
