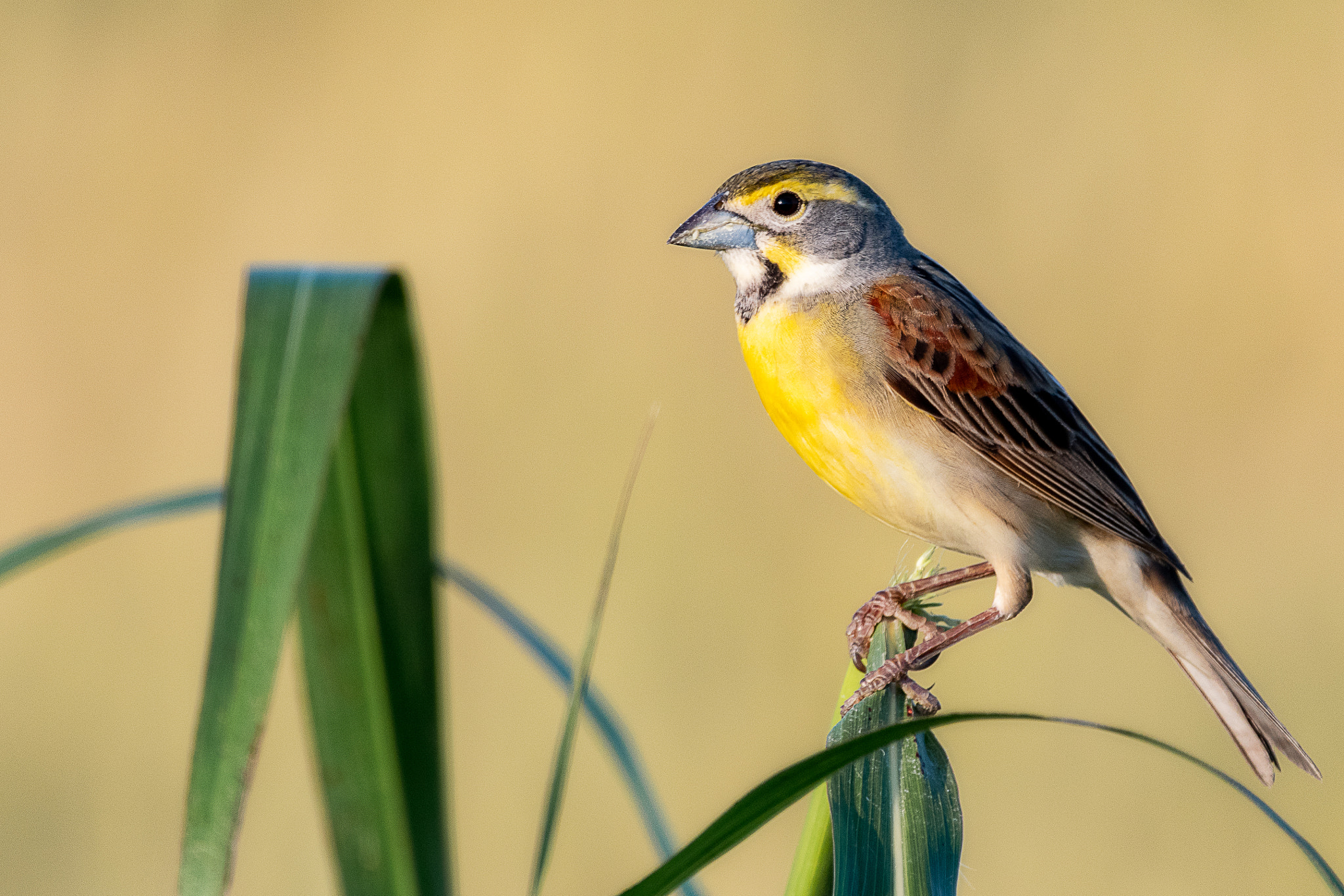
- Male breeding dickcissel (Spiza americana).
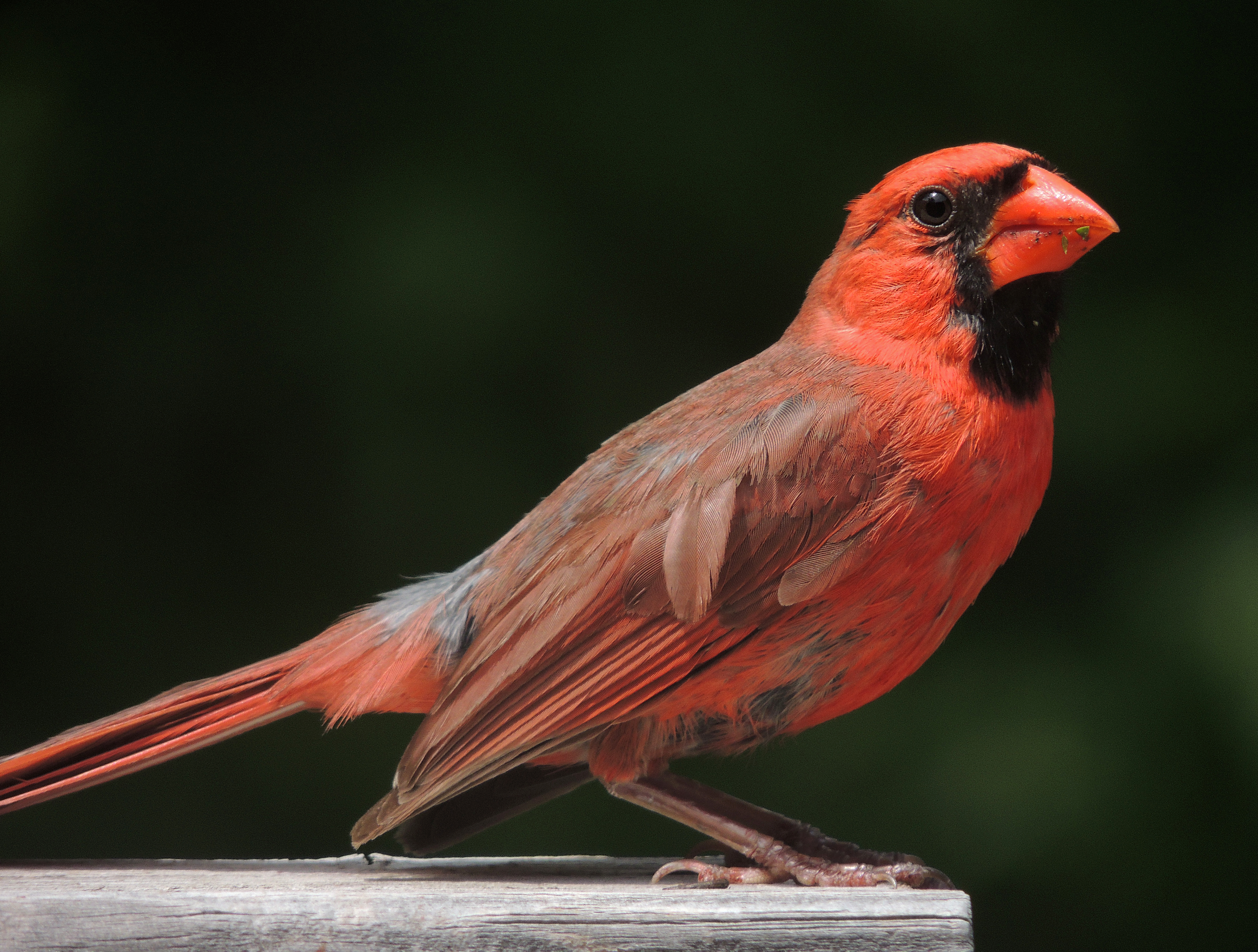
- Male northern cardinal (Cardinalis cardinalis).

Scientific classification
- Kingdom: Animalia
- Phylum: Chordata
- Class: Aves
- Order: Passeriformes
- Superfamily: Emberizoidea
- Family: Cardinalidae; Ridgway, 1901

Type species
- Loxia cardinalis Linnaeus, 1758

Genera
- Pheucticus; Granatellus; Spiza; Cyanoloxia; Amaurospiza; Cyanocompsa; Passerina; Habia; Chlorothraupis; Cardinalis; Caryothraustes; Periporphyrus; Driophlox; Piranga

= Cardinalidae =

Cardinalids Temporal range: Miocene-Holocene, 12–0 Ma

Bird family

Cardinalidae (sometimes referred to as "cardinal-grosbeaks" or simply "cardinals") is a family of New World-endemic passerine birds that consists of cardinals, grosbeaks, and buntings. It also includes several other genera such as the tanager-like Piranga and the warbler-like Granatellus. Membership of this family is not easily defined by a single or even a set of physical characteristics, but instead by molecular work. Among songbirds, they range from average-sized to relatively large and have stout features. Some species have large, heavy bills.

Members of this group are beloved for their brilliant red, yellow, or blue plumages seen in many of the breeding males in this family. Most species are monogamous breeders that nest in open-cup nests, with parents taking turns incubating the eggs and taking care of their young. Most are arboreal species, although the dickcissel (Spiza americana) is a ground-dwelling prairie bird.

In terms of conservation, most members of this family are considered least concern by the IUCN Red List. However, a few birds, such as the Carrizal seedeater (Amaurospiza carrizalensis), are considered endangered.

== Field characteristics ==
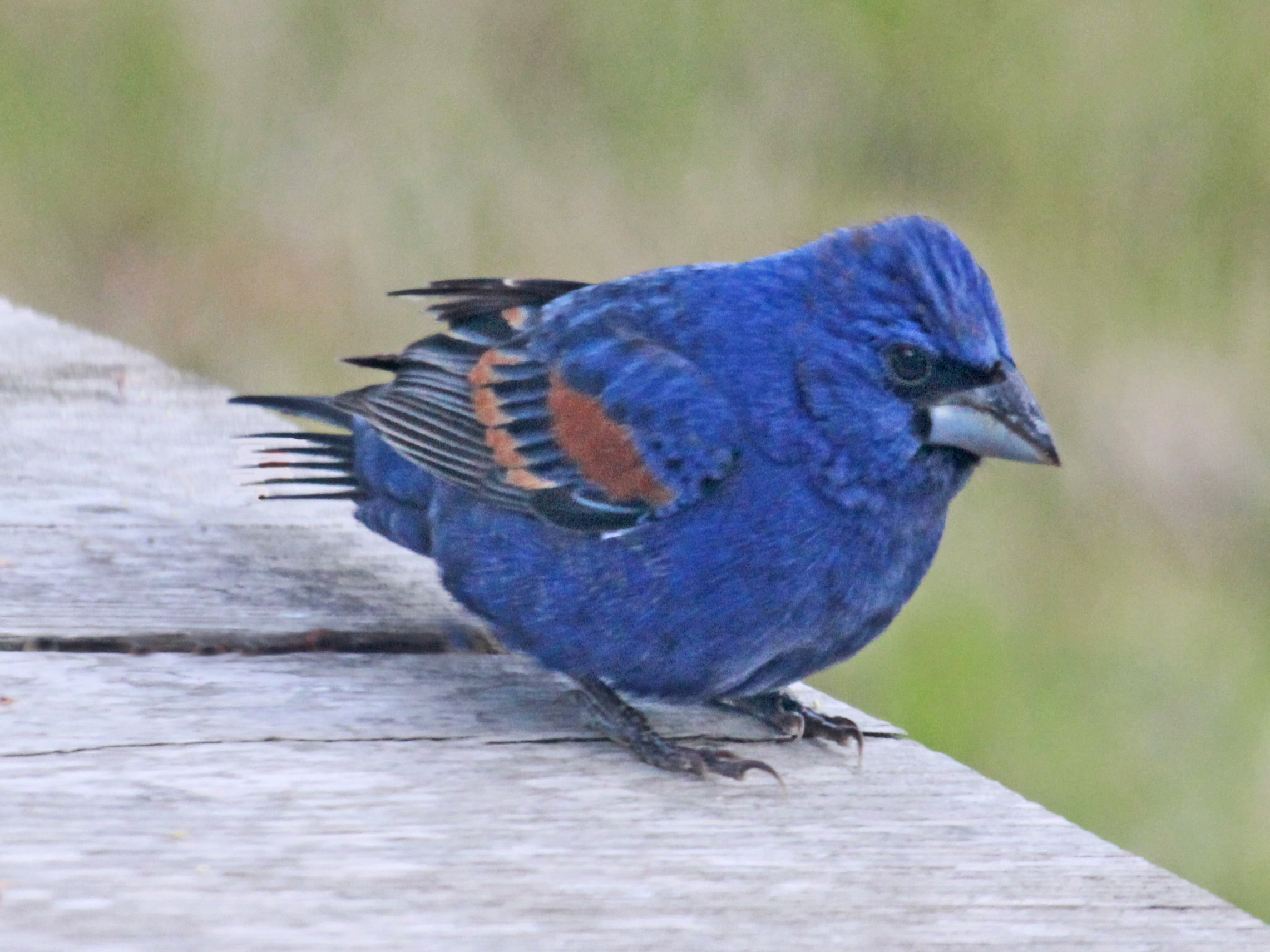
The male of the blue grosbeak showing the brilliant blue coloration with brown shoulders

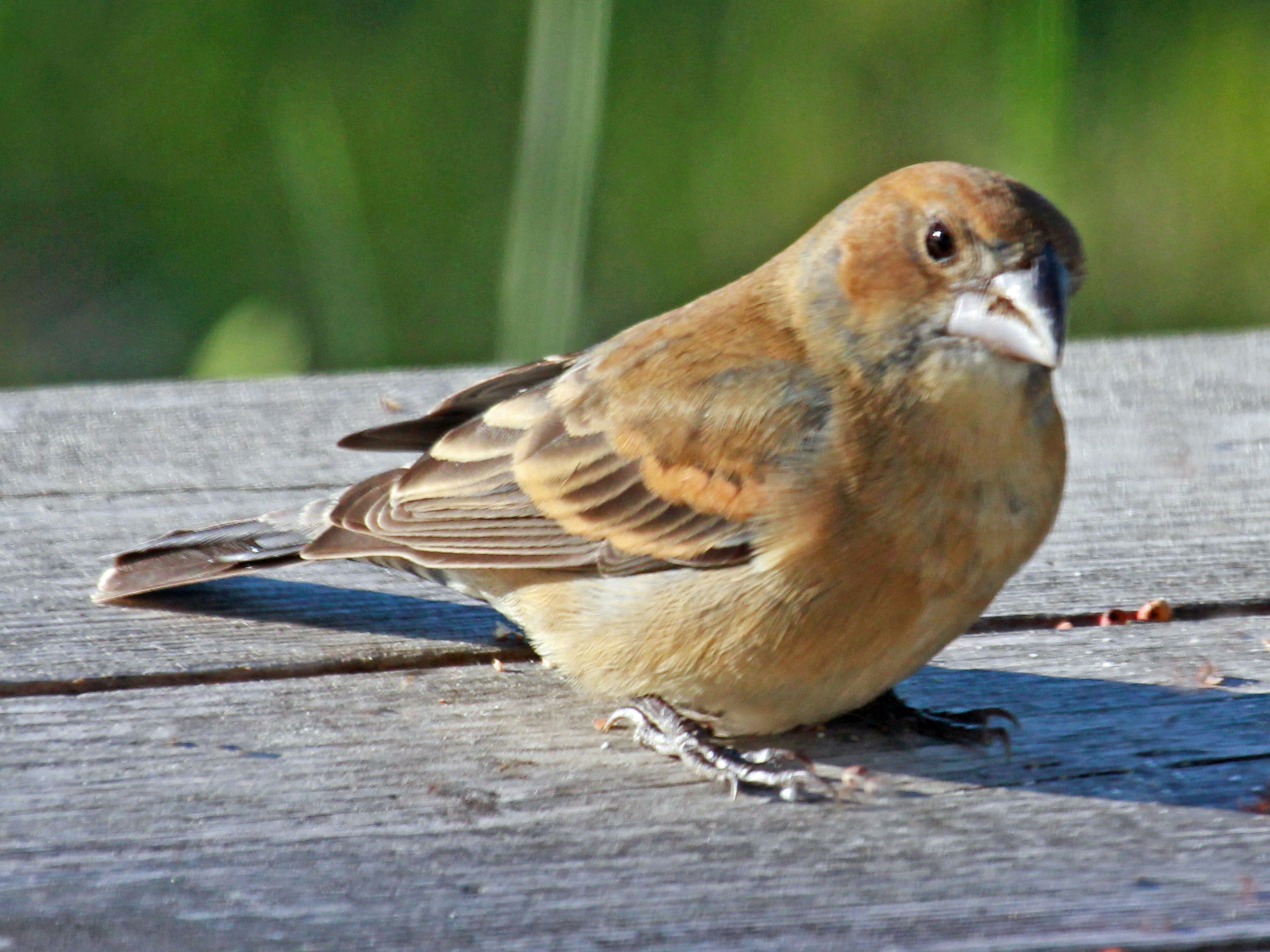
The female of the blue grosbeak is predominantly brown

The grosbeaks, seedeaters, and cardinals have large bills, while Granatellus and buntings have small bills. The cardinalid tanagers have stout, nearly pointed bills, with some species of Piranga having serrations along the edges of their upper bills. Bill shape is not always an indicator of species' relationships, however, as the various species of blue cardinalid species, like the blue grosbeak (Passerina caerulea) and Cyanoloxia grosbeaks, are related to the buntings. Similarly, the cardinalid tanagers are closer to the cardinals and masked grosbeaks (see more in the systematics section). The head is medium to large, with a medium neck length. Cardinalid species bodies range from small to medium, with lengths of 11 to 28 cm (4.5 to 11 in). Legs are also short to medium in length. The wings are medium and pointed. Cardinalids have nine visible primary feathers, with the tenth primary feather shorter than the others.

The plumages in cardinalids are sexually dichromatic. In many species, the males are bright red, orange, blue, or black. In most temperate species, however, males molt between seasons, such that non-breeding males will somewhat resemble the females of their species. These species, such as the indigo bunting (Passerina cyanea), exhibit a complex molt cycle going through four different stages of plumage within their first year of life. From spring to summer, birds start with juvenile plumage to supplemental plumage, then change to a first basic (non-breeding) plumage from fall to winter, and finally reach the first alternate (breeding) plumage. Adults typically have the basic two molt cycle change to basic or partial in late summer or fall, and then return to alternate again in the spring. Males of tropical species retain the same coloration year-round. Females of all species are drabber in coloration and often lighter in color than males.

The molting pattern in most cardinalids exhibits delayed plumage maturation, so that first-year male birds are in non-breeding plumage or an intermediate state. The molting pattern in cardinalids is divided into two types. A preformative molt is a partial molt where only the body feathers get replaced, but not the wing and tail feathers, which is seen in a lot of temperate and neotropical species. The second type is an eccentric preformative molt, in which only the outer primary and inner secondary feathers are replaced. This molt is seen in some species of Cyanoloxia and Passerina.

== Systematics ==
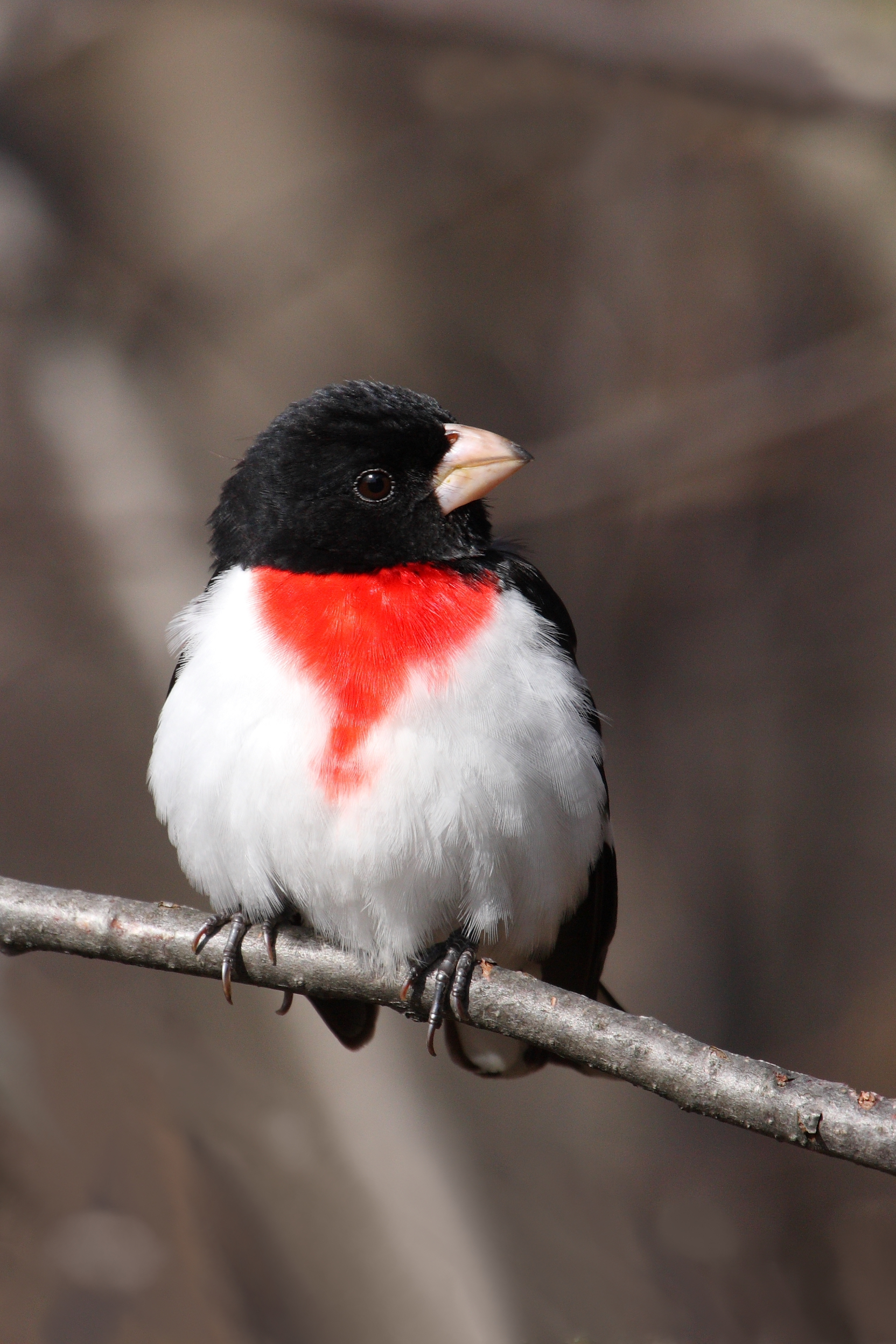
Members of Cardinalidae include the rose-breasted grosbeak (Pheucticus ludovicianus). Note the heavy bill characteristic of the family.

Traditionally, members of this group were classified as a tribe of the finch family Fringillidae (Cardinalini), characterized by heavy, conical, seed-crushing bills. The group consisted of the genera Pheucticus, Parkerthraustes, Saltator, Spiza, Cyanocompsa, Cyanoloxia, Porphyrospiza, Passerina, Caryothraustes, Periporphyrus, and Cardinalis. The issue that taxonomists faced was that there were no unifying morphological traits that were in agreement across various studies. In 2007, a mitochondrial DNA study by Klicka, Burns and Spellman sampling all of the genera above and 34 of the total 42 species, found that the genera Parkerthraustes, Saltator, and Porphyrospiza were not members of the cardinal lineage, but instead are found throughout in the tanager lineage (Thraupidae). Several genera classified as thraupids at the time—Piranga, Habia, Chlorothraupis, and Amaurospiza—were found to be part of cardinalid radiation. In addition, the genus Granatellus, originally classified as a parulid warbler, was also found to be part of Cardinalidae. The study found that with these new relationships, Cardinalidae can be classified into six subgroups, which subsequent studies have supported. The six subclades consists of the Pheucticus lineage, the Granatellus lineage, the “blue” lineage (Spiza, Cyanoloxia, Amaurospiza, Cyanocompsa, and Passerina), the Habia lineage (Habia and Chlorothraupis), the “masked” lineage (Caryothraustes, Periporphyrus, and Cardinalis), and the Piranga lineage (Piranga and Driophlox). These subclades and membership of these genera have been widely supported in subsequent studies. A 2021 paper by Guallar et al. based on the preformative molting pattern of cardinalids suggested the ancestor of this group was a forest-dwelling bird that dispersed into open habitats on numerous occasions.

The cardinalids are part of a larger grouping of American endemic songbirds, Emberizoidea, which also includes the aforementioned thraupids and parulids, as well as icterids (New World blackbirds), passerellids (New World sparrows), and several smaller families that contain one or a couple of genera. Several studies have placed cardinalids as either the sister group to Thraupidae, Mitrospingidae (a small family whose genera were formerly classified as thraupids), or as a sister to a clade containing thraupids and mitrospingids. At least one study suggested that cardinalids could be treated as a subfamily of Thraupidae.

=== Phylogeny ===
The genus level cladogram of the Cardinalidae shown below is based on molecular phylogenetic study published in 2024 which analyzed DNA sequences flanking ultraconserved elements (UCEs). The number of species in each genus is taken from the list maintained by Frank Gill, Pamela C. Rasmussen and David Donsker on behalf of the International Ornithological Committee (IOC).

- Cardinalidae
  - Pheucticus – grosbeaks (6 species)
  - - - Granatellus – chats (3 species)
      - - Spiza – dickcissel
        - - Cyanoloxia – grosbeaks (4 species)
          - - Amaurospiza – seedeaters (4 species)
            - - Cyanocompsa – blue bunting
              - Passerina – buntings + blue grosbeak (7 species)
    - - - Habia – red-crowned ant tanager
        - Chlorothraupis – tanagers (4 species)
      - - - Cardinalis – cardinals + pyrrhuloxia (3 species)
          - - Caryothraustes – grosbeaks (2 species)
            - Periporphyrus – grosbeaks (2 species)
        - - Driophlox – ant tanagers (4 species, formerly assigned to Habia)
          - Piranga – tanagers (11 species)

=== Species list ===
The following 53 species and 14 genera are recognized by the IOC as of July 2024:

Image	Genus	Living species
	Pheucticus L. Reichenbach, 1850	Yellow grosbeak, Pheucticus chrysopeplus; Black-thighed grosbeak, Pheucticus tibialis; Golden grosbeak, Pheucticus chrysogaster; Black-backed grosbeak, Pheucticus aureoventris; Rose-breasted grosbeak, Pheucticus ludovicianus; Black-headed grosbeak, Pheucticus melanocephalus
	Granatellus Bonaparte, 1850	Red-breasted chat, Granatellus venustus; Grey-throated chat, Granatellus sallaei; Rose-breasted chat, Granatellus pelzelni
	Spiza Bonaparte, 1824	Dickcissel, Spiza americana
	Cyanoloxia Bonaparte, 1850	Glaucous-blue grosbeak, Cyanoloxia glaucocaerulea; Blue-black grosbeak, Cyanoloxia cyanoides; Amazonian grosbeak, Cyanoloxia rothschildii; Ultramarine grosbeak, Cyanoloxia brissonii
	Amaurospiza Cabanis, 1861	Cabanis's seedeater, Amaurospiza concolor; Ecuadorian seedeater, Amaurospiza aequatorialis; Blackish-blue seedeater, Amaurospiza moesta; Carrizal seedeater, Amaurospiza carrizalensis
	Cyanocompsa Cabanas, 1861	Blue bunting, Cyanocompsa parellina
	Passerina Vieillot, 1816 North American buntings	Blue grosbeak, Passerina caerulea; Indigo bunting, Passerina cyanea; Lazuli bunting, Passerina amoena; Varied bunting, Passerina versicolor; Painted bunting, Passerina ciris; Rose-bellied bunting, Passerina rositae; Orange-breasted bunting, Passerina leclancherii
	Habia Blyth, 1840	Red-crowned ant tanager, Habia rubica
	Chlorothraupis Salvin & Godman, 1883	Carmiol's tanager, Chlorothraupis carmioli; Yellow-lored tanager, Chlorothraupis frenata; Lemon-spectacled tanager, Chlorothraupis olivacea; Ochre-breasted tanager, Chlorothraupis stolzmanni
	Cardinalis Bonaparte, 1838	Northern cardinal, Cardinalis cardinalis; Vermilion cardinal, Cardinalis phoeniceus; Pyrrhuloxia, Cardinalis sinuatus
	Caryothraustes L. Reichenbach, 1850	Black-faced grosbeak, Caryothraustes poliogaster; Yellow-green grosbeak, Caryothraustes canadensis
	Periporphyrus L. Reichenbach, 1850	Red-and-black grosbeak, Periporphyrus erythromelas; Crimson-collared grosbeak, Periporphyrus celaeno
	Driophlox Scott, BF, Chesser, Unitt & Burns, KJ, 2024	Red-throated ant tanager, Driophlox fuscicauda; Black-cheeked ant tanager, Driophlox atrimaxillaris; Sooty ant tanager, Driophlox gutturalis; Crested ant tanager, Driophlox cristata
	Piranga Vieillot, 1808	Flame-colored tanager, Piranga bidentata; Tooth-billed tanager, Piranga lutea; Red tanager, Piranga flava; Hepatic tanager, Piranga hepatica; Summer tanager, Piranga rubra; Rose-throated tanager, Piranga roseogularis; Scarlet tanager, Piranga olivacea; Western tanager, Piranga ludoviciana; White-winged tanager, Piranga leucoptera; Red-headed tanager, Piranga erythrocephala; Red-hooded tanager, Piranga rubriceps

== Natural history ==
=== Habitat, distribution, and migration ===
Cardinalids are found from Canada to northern Argentina and Uruguay, with Central America having the highest species diversity. Species are found year-round in the Central United States and the Eastern United States down to the neotropics. Cardinalids found in the West Indies are non-breeding migrants, and those in the Western United States and Canada are breeding migrants. The western tanager (Piranga ludoviciana) is the northernmost species in the family; their breeding ranges occur in southern portions of the Northwest Territories. The northern cardinal (Cardinalis cardinalis) has been introduced in Hawaii and Bermuda. They occupy a variety of habitats, including forests, grasslands, and arid scrublands. Most North American cardinalid species migrate south for the winter, whether further south in the continent or extending into the neotropics, except the northern cardinal and pyrrhuloxia (Cardinalis sinuatus), which stay year-round. The neotropical species are resident year-round in their range.

=== Feeding ecology ===
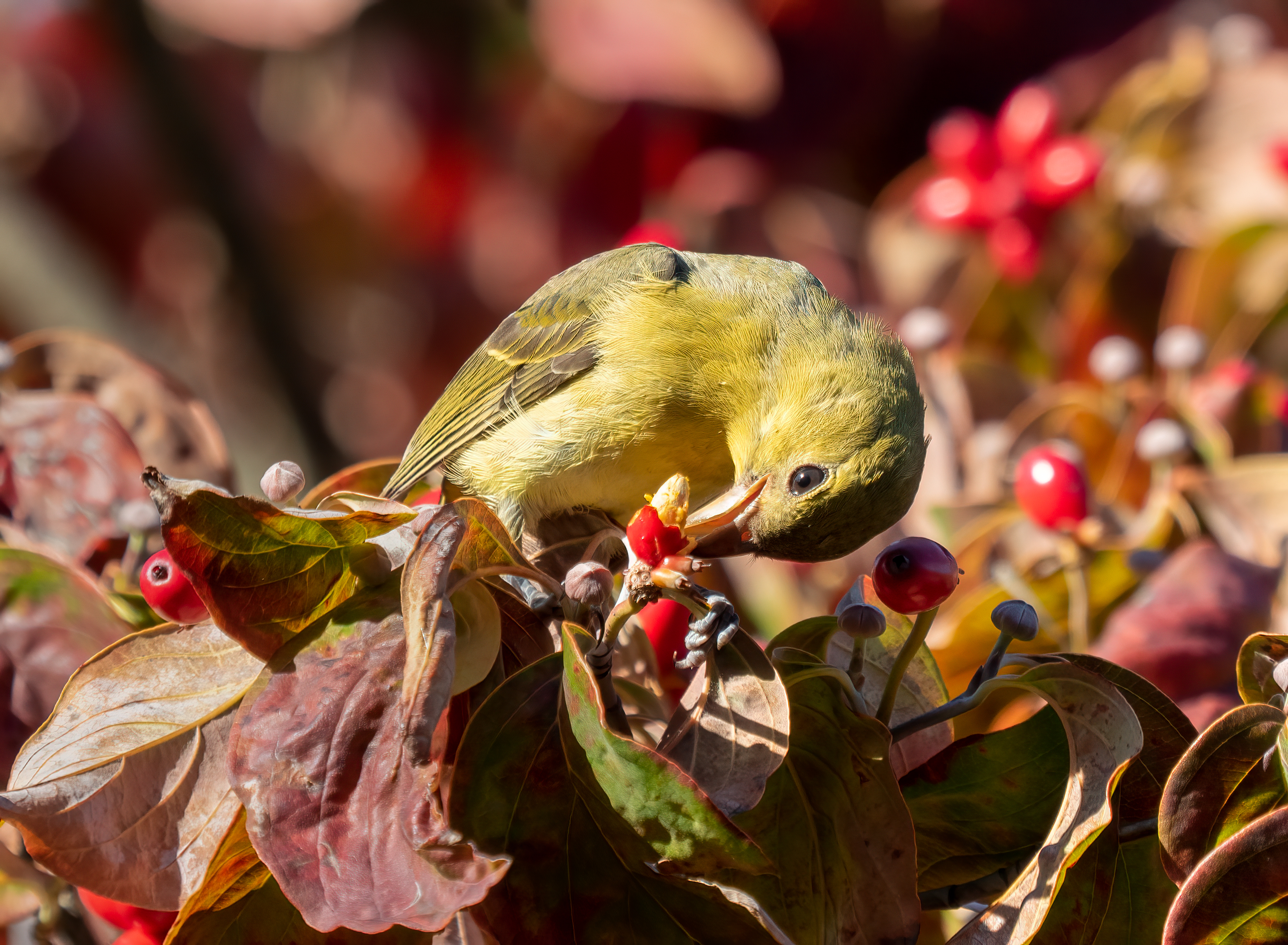
A scarlet tanager (Piranga olivacea) foraging in a flowering dogwood tree.

Cardinals, dickcissels, seedeaters, buntings, and grosbeaks have thicker, seed-crushing bills that enable them to feed heavily on fruits and seeds outside the breeding season (especially in winter for northern species such as the dickcissel mentioned above and the northern cardinal). Once their breeding season begins, members of this group will supplement their diet with invertebrate prey, which is vital for raising their young and offsetting the energetic costs of reproduction and other daily activities. The genera Chlorothraupis, Habia, Driophlox, Piranga, and Granatellus have slightly longer and less deep bills, whose diet mostly consists of insects, fruit, nectar and sap, less so on seeds. Cardinalids typically forage alone, low level, or on the ground, though some like Piranga and grosbeaks will forage high in the tree canopy. Many will come to bird feeders, especially during the winter.

=== Breeding and reproduction ===
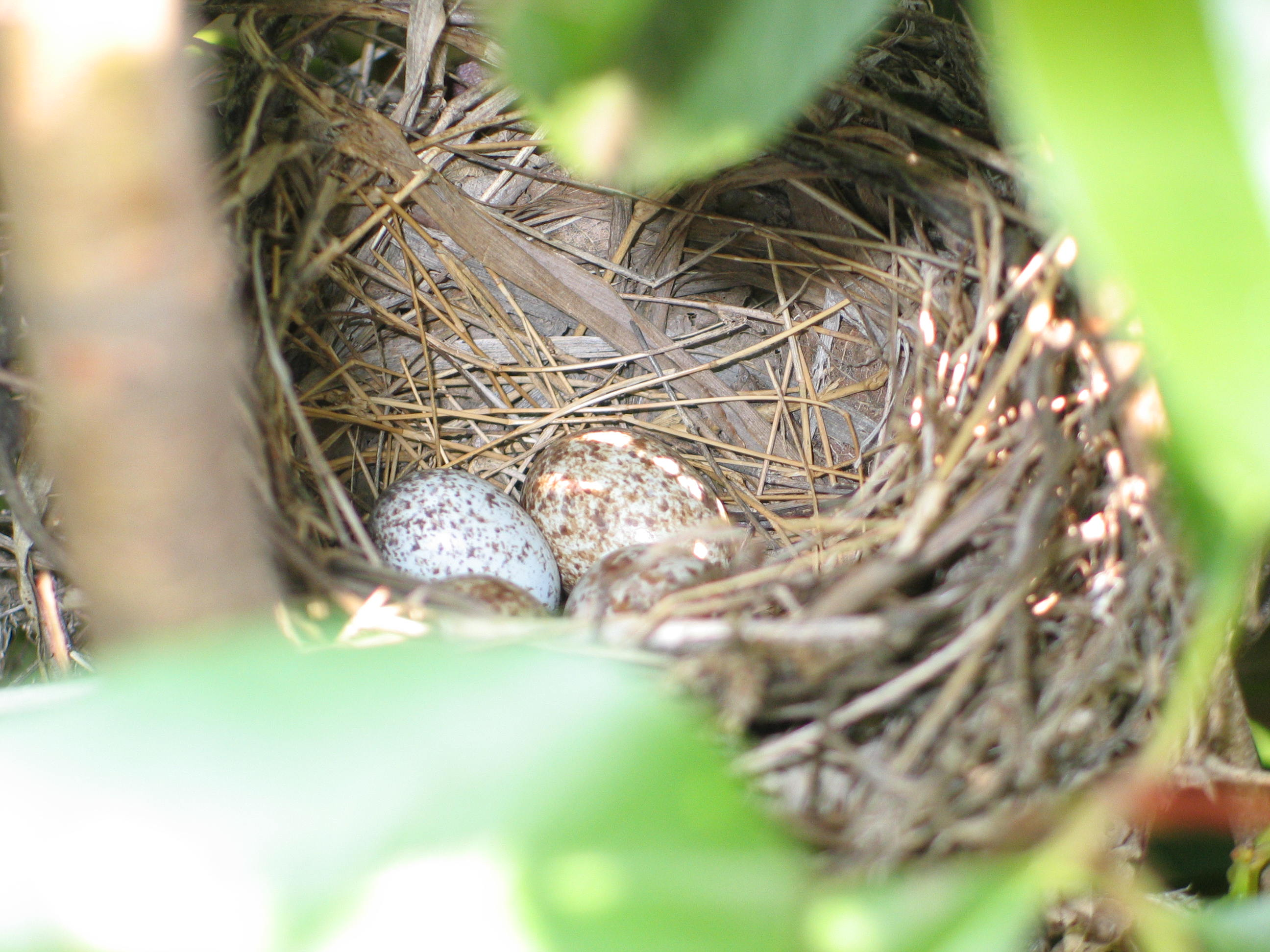
A northern cardinal (Cardinalis cardinalis) nest showing the open-cup nest structure and key features of Cardinalidae eggs.

Nearly all cardinalids are monogamous breeders and are highly territorial. Most species are monogamous during the breeding season, and each year, birds may pair with different partners. The only exception is the dickcissel, which is a polygynous species that nests in dense grasses and sedges. Other non-monogamous species include the lazuli bunting and the painted bunting, which perform extra-copulation with multiple partners. The family is known for their intense, brilliant songs. In some species, like the lazuli bunting and the indigo bunting, the birds learn singing by match-based learning, meaning that first-year breeding males will learn by copying the songs of nearby males, as opposed to learning it while they are in the nest. Even more unusual is the females of a few species, such as the scarlet tanager, northern cardinal, pyrrhuloxia, and black-headed grosbeak (Pheucticus melanocephalus), which sing as well. In temperate species, the breeding season occurs annually, while in tropical species it is year-round. The breeding seasons are synchronized with insect abundance. Most species build open-cup nests made of grasses and twigs, depending on the species. These nests would be in the trees, often high up in the crown. Nest building is performed by both partners or by the female alone. The male and female take turns incubating the nest; often, the male feeds the female. A clutch averages one to six eggs, with tropical species laying the fewest. Cardinalids produce one to three broods per season. As with other passerines, the young are born altricial and fledged between one and two weeks.

== Conservation ==
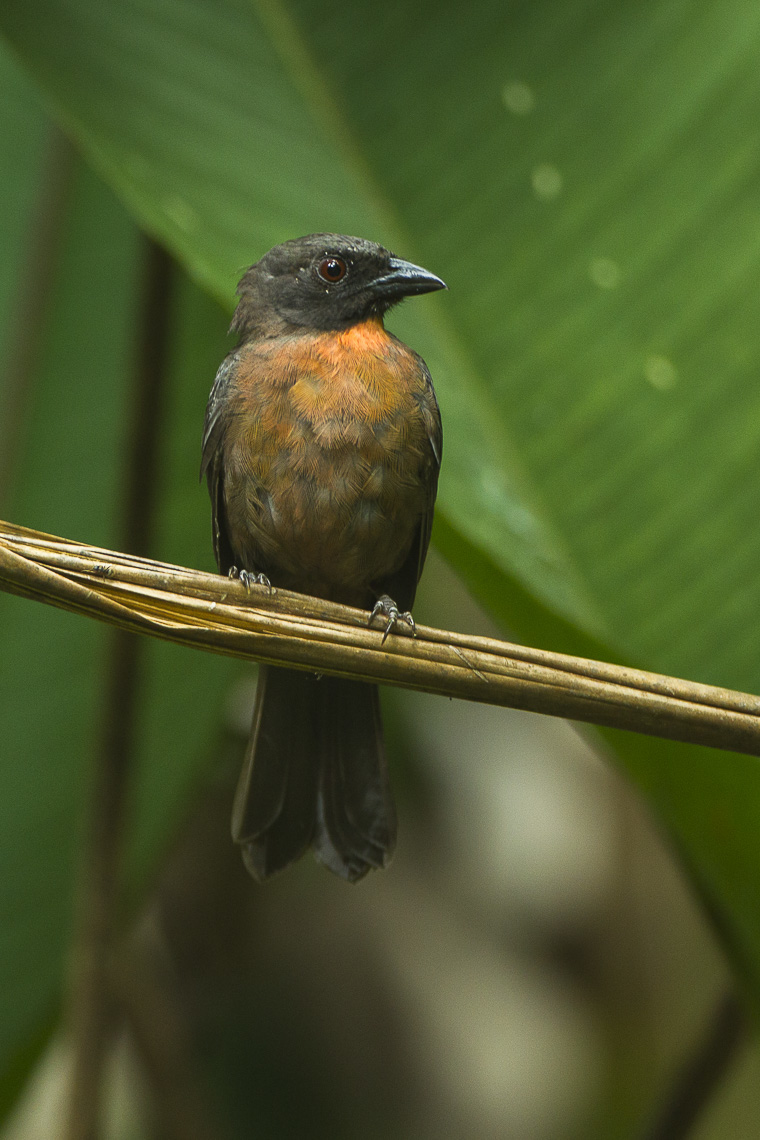
The black-cheeked ant-tanager (Driophlox atrimaxillaris) is one of the few threatened species of Cardinalidae. Endemic to the Osa Peninsula, Costa Rica, this species is subject to habitat loss.

As of 2021, the IUCN Red List has nearly 82 percent of cardinalids to be least concern. However, there are a handful of species that are of conservation concern. The rose-bellied bunting (Passerina rositae) is an endemic near-threatened species as they are found in a small area of Oaxaca and Chiapas, Mexico; the black-cheeked ant-tanager is another endemic species found in Osa Peninsula in Costa Rica and the carrizal seedeater a critically endangered species found in the spiny bamboo thickets in the understory of deciduous forest in a remote southeastern corner of Venezuela. All of these species are threatened by habitat loss and by confinement to much smaller ranges. The IUCN has not yet reevaluate the other species of seedeaters in the genus Amaurospiza.

Despite the vast majority of species being classified as least concern, there is growing recognition that the climate crisis may impact the distribution and migration of many cardinalid species. One study led by Dr. Brooke L. Bateman, published in July 2020, focused on the risks that North American birds will face from climate change and the measures required to protect them. The first study assessed 604 species in the United States and found that, if the planet warmed by 3.0 degrees Celsius, many species, particularly arctic birds, waterbirds, and boreal and western forest birds, would be highly vulnerable to climate change. Future conservation efforts will need to be in place. Among the species sampled, the North American species of Piranga and Pheucticus are found to be most climate vulnerable of the cardinalids. These species will either lose a substantial amount of their range or they will migrate north to escape the sudden change in their habitat.

A possible extinct species is the controversial Townsend's bunting (Spiza townsendi), a supposed enigmatic species related to the dickcissel. The Townsend's bunting is only known from a single type specimen collected from Chester County, Pennsylvania by John Kirk Townsend and described by John James Audubon in 1834. The specimen is housed in the National Museum of Natural History. Genetic analysis has not been done on this specimen, but a study of the plumage has been conducted. Researchers are unsure about the specimen's status as an extinct species, a rare color-variant of the dickcissel, or a hybrid (of a female dickcissel and male blue grosbeak). If the bird is indeed a dickcissel, however, it lacks the known field characteristics of the species across all life stages and sexes.
