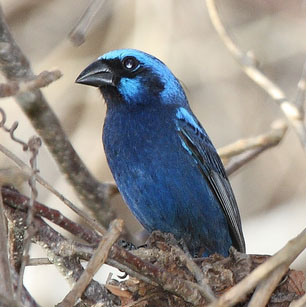
- Male
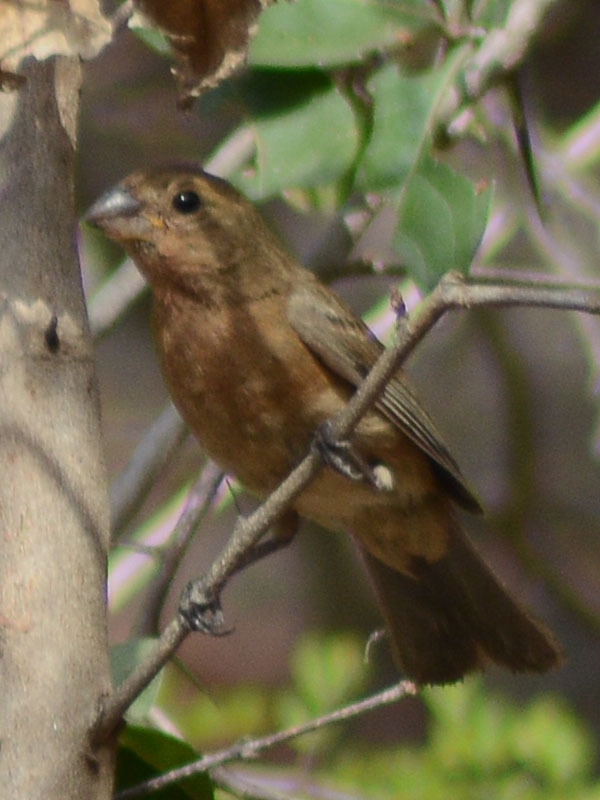
- Female

Conservation status
- Least Concern (IUCN 3.1)

Scientific classification
- Kingdom: Animalia
- Phylum: Chordata
- Class: Aves
- Order: Passeriformes
- Family: Cardinalidae
- Genus: Cyanocompsa; Cabanis, 1861
- Species: C. parellina

Binomial name
- Cyanocompsa parellina (Bonaparte, 1850)

= Blue bunting =

Species of bird

The blue bunting (Cyanocompsa parellina) is a species of passerine in the family Cardinalidae, the cardinals or cardinal grosbeaks. It is found in Belize, El Salvador, Guatemala, Honduras, Mexico, and Nicaragua.

== Taxonomy and systematics ==
French naturalist Charles Lucien Bonaparte described the blue bunting in 1850 as Passerina parellina, and then Cyanoloxia parellina. German ornithologist Jean Cabanis defined the genus Cyanocompsa in 1861, giving it its current binomial name.

The blue bunting is the only member of its genus. It has four subspecies, the nominate Cyanocompsa parellina parellina, C. p. beneplacita, C. p. indigotica, and C. p. lucida. The last is sometimes included in C. p. beneplacita.

== Description ==
The nominate subspecies of blue bunting is 13 to 14 cm (5.1 to 5.5 in) long. Males weigh 11 to 24 g (0.39 to 0.85 oz) and females 9.8 to 21 g (0.35 to 0.74 oz). The nominate male is various shades of blue, sky blue on the forehead and cheek, blackish blue on the upperparts, ultramarine on the rump, and the underparts from chin to belly deep blue. The adult and immature females are overall dull brownish, with a reddish tinge to the belly. The immature male is overall gray-blue with a brownish wash on the belly.

Compared to the nominate, the C. p. beneplacita male is a duller blue and the female paler and with less of a reddish tinge on the belly. The male C. p. lucida's blue is between those of the nominate and C. p. beneplacita and the sky blue covers more of its head. The female is similar to that of beneplacita. The male C. p. indigotica is dull indigo on the darker areas and cerulean on the lighter ones; the female is lighter brown than the nominate.

== Distribution and habitat ==
The nominate subspecies of blue bunting is the most widespread. It occurs from Veracruz in eastern Mexico south and east through Belize, Guatemala, Honduras, and El Salvador into northwestern Nicaragua. C. p. beneplacita is mostly confined to Nuevo León in northeastern Mexico, though it occasionally wanders into Texas and Louisiana. C. p. lucida is found in northeastern and eastern Mexico. C. p. indigotica ranges in western Mexico from Sinaloa south to Oaxaca and Chiapas.

The blue bunting inhabits dense vegetation such as scrubby areas, thickets, and the undergrowth and edges of tall forest. In elevation it ranges up to 1,800 m (5,900 ft) in Mexico and to 900 m (3,000 ft) in Guatemala.

== Behavior ==
=== Feeding ===
The blue bunting forages singly or in pairs through low vegetation. Its diet has not been described.

=== Breeding ===
Little information published about the blue bunting's breeding phenology. Nests have been described; they were cups made of rootlets and other fine plant material and placed in bushes. Clutches were of two and three eggs.

=== Vocalization ===
The blue bunting's song is "a sweet, rather sad warble" . Its call is a metallic note .

== Status ==
The IUCN has assessed the blue bunting as being of Least Concern. It is fairly common and "[s]eems able to accept moderate modification of habitat."
