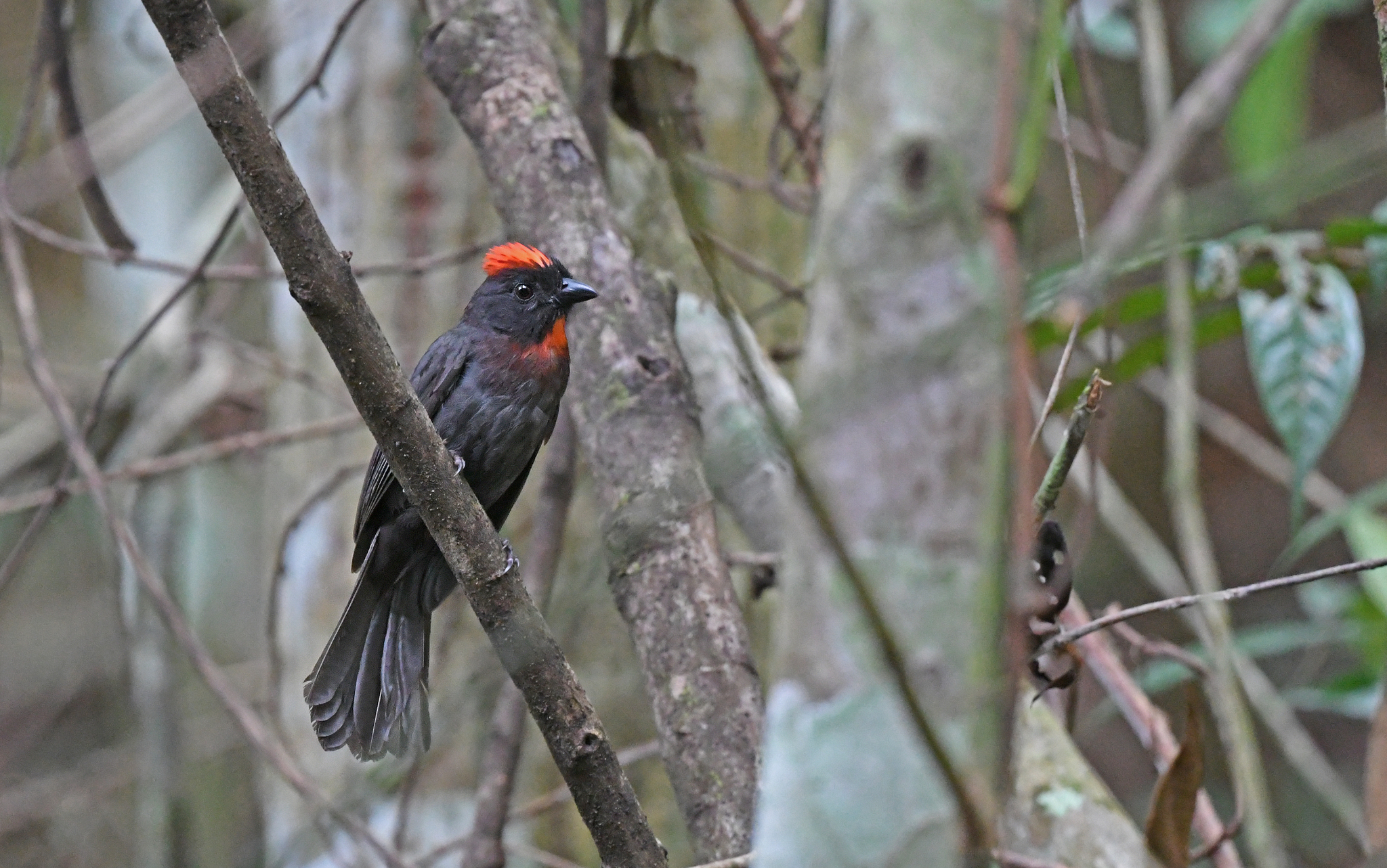

Conservation status
- Least Concern (IUCN 3.1)

Scientific classification
- Kingdom: Animalia
- Phylum: Chordata
- Class: Aves
- Order: Passeriformes
- Family: Cardinalidae
- Genus: Driophlox
- Species: D. gutturalis

Binomial name
- Driophlox gutturalis (Sclater, PL, 1854)

= Sooty ant tanager =

Species of bird

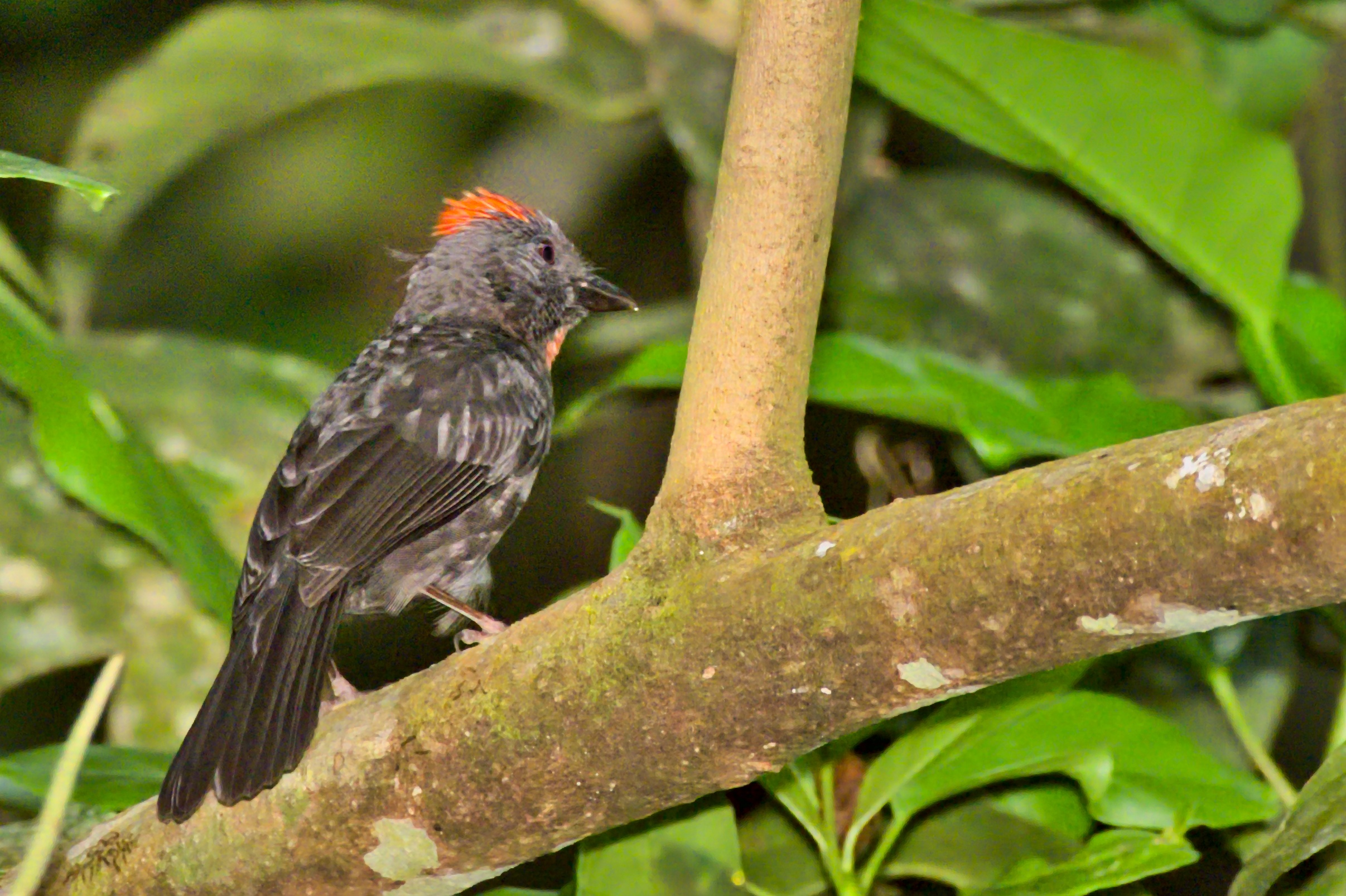
Sooty ant tanager

The sooty ant tanager (Driophlox gutturalis) is a species of bird in the family Cardinalidae, the cardinals, grosbeaks, and “tanager” allies. It is endemic to Colombia.

== Taxonomy and systematics ==
The sooty ant tanager was formally described in 1854 by the English zoologist Philip Sclater with the binomial Phoenicothraupis gutturalis. The specific epithet gutturalis is Latin meaning "of the throat".

The sooty ant tanager has a complicated taxonomic history. It was long placed in genus Habia and classified as a tanager in the family Thraupidae. Following a series of studies published in the early 2000s, beginning in 2009 taxonomic systems reclassified the genus as a member the family Cardinalidae. In 2024 most systems transferred the sooty ant-tanager and three other species from Habia to the newly-erected genus Driophlox. However, as of late 2025 BirdLife International's Handbook of the Birds of the World retains them in Habia.

The sooty ant tanager is monotypic.

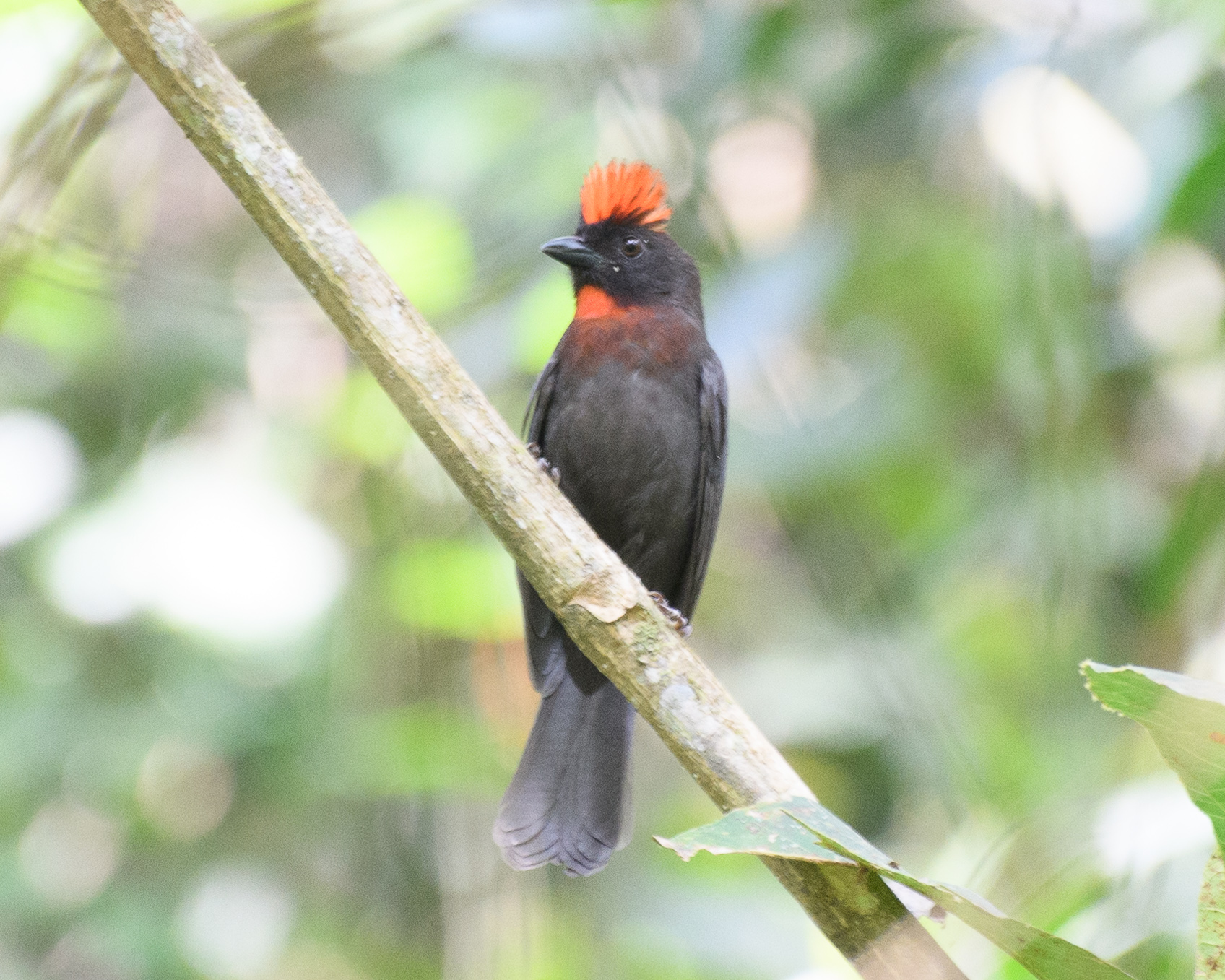
Sooty ant tanager male with crest raised

== Description ==
The sooty ant tanager is 17 cm (6.7 in) to 20 cm (7.9 in) long. The species is weakly sexually dimorphic. Adult males are almost entirely dusky gray with a red-scarlet crest, a reddish pink center of the throat, and a blacker face. Females are less dusky and have a duller and paler throat than males. Both sexes have a brown iris, brown legs and feet, and a black bill.

== Distribution and habitat ==
The sooty ant tanager is found in northwestern Colombia in the middle section of the Magdalena River valley, the Nechí River valley, and the northern reaches of the Central and Western Andes. It inhabits the understory in the interior and edges of humid forest both primary and secondary, and is often found near watercourses. Sources differ on its elevational range. One states it as 100 to 1,100 m (300 to 3,600 ft) and another says 100 to 1,500 m (300 to 4,900 ft).

== Behavior ==
=== Movement ===
The sooty ant-tanager is a sedentary year-round resident.

=== Feeding ===
The sooty ant tanager feeds mostly on arthropods but also includes fruit in its diet. Single birds and family groups forage in the forest understory, usually up to about 5 m (15 ft) above the ground. It takes most prey by snatching it from the undersides of leaves approached with a flutter-flight. It regularly but not exclusively attends army ant swarms to capture prey fleeing them.

=== Breeding ===
The sooty ant-tanager's breeding season has not been defined but appears to span at least February to June. Its nest is a cup whose outer structure is coarse plant material lined and with finer fern fibers. The few known nests were in vegetation not far above the ground. Apparently only the female incubates the clutch but both parents provision nestlings. The clutch size, incubation period, and time to fledging are not known.

=== Vocalization ===
The sooty ant tanager's song is "melodious, composed by whistles that are repeated and mixed with other sound elements", and is usually sung at dawn and dusk. Its usual call is "a fast chatter of ca 15 notes, e.g. Chak-cha-cha-cha-cha-cha".

== Status ==
The IUCN originally in 1988 assessed the sooty ant tanager as Threatened, then in 1994 as Near Threatened, and since 2020 as being of Least Concern. Its population size is not known and is believed to be decreasing. "Suitable habitat within its range has been reduced. The middle and lower Magdalena valley has been extensively deforested since the 19th century for agriculture, and clearance of its foothills has been near total since the 1950s...However, the species shows some resilience to habitat fragmentation, [and] can persist in patches of mature secondary growth and frequents forest borders." It is considered local in its somewhat limited range. "Although the Sooty Ant-Tanager occurs in several protected areas, none of these protected areas are specifically managed for this species anywhere in the range."
