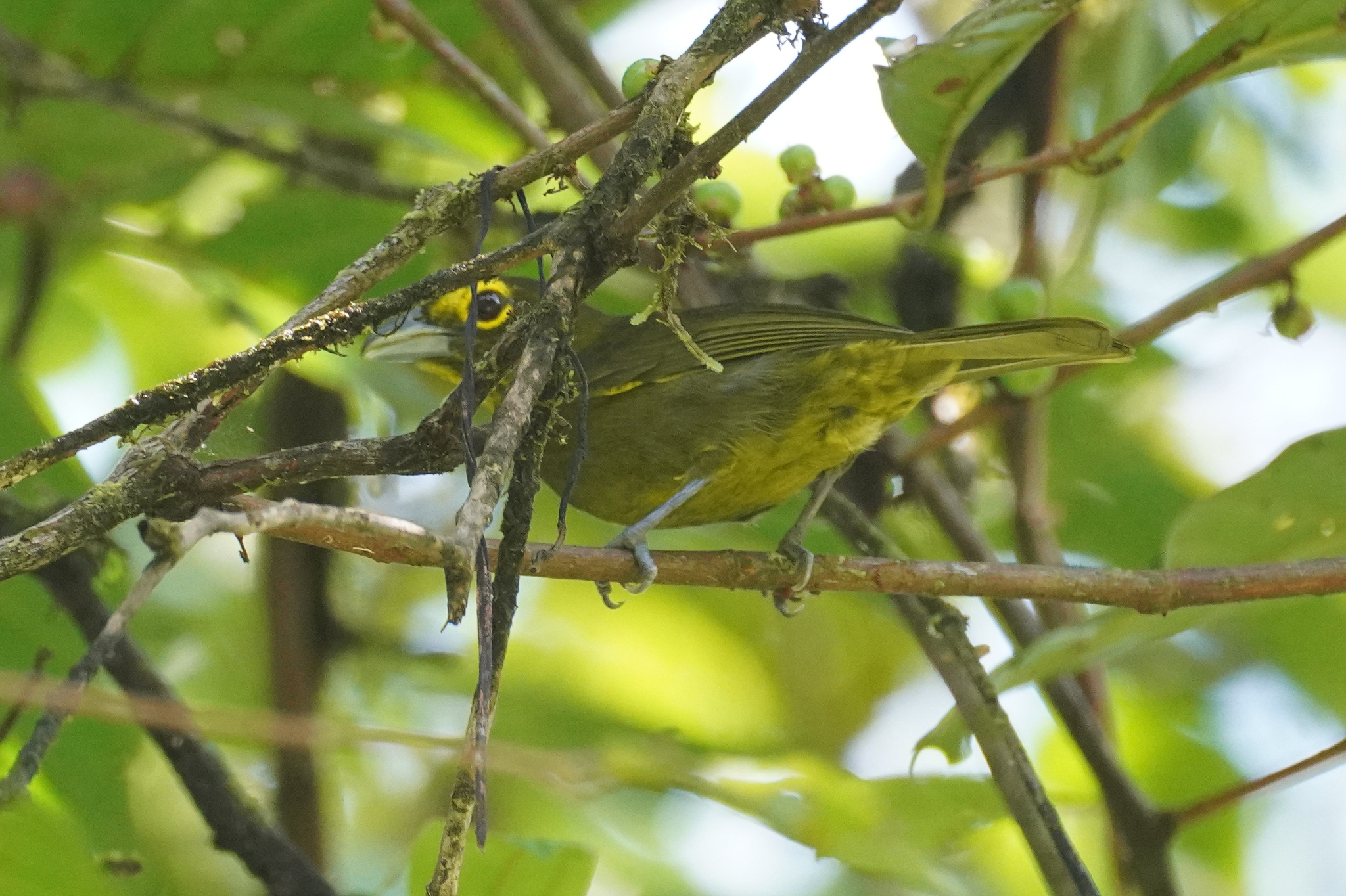

Conservation status
- Least Concern (IUCN 3.1)

Scientific classification
- Kingdom: Animalia
- Phylum: Chordata
- Class: Aves
- Order: Passeriformes
- Family: Cardinalidae
- Genus: Chlorothraupis
- Species: C. olivacea

Binomial name
- Chlorothraupis olivacea (Cassin, 1860)
- Approximate range

= Lemon-spectacled tanager =

Species of bird

The lemon-spectacled tanager (Chlorothraupis olivacea) is a species of bird in the family Cardinalidae. It is found in Colombia, Ecuador, and Panama where its natural habitats are subtropical or tropical moist lowland forest, subtropical or tropical moist montane forest, and heavily degraded former forest.

== Description ==
The adult lemon-spectacled tanager is about 17 cm (6.7 in) in length. It is very similar in appearance to the olive tanager but the male is a rather darker shade of dull olive-green with the underparts have less yellow on the throat. The female is also similar to the female olive tanager, the underparts being yellowish-olive, and the only clear distinction between the two species is in the yellow eye-ring, possessed by both sexes of this species; the lemon-spectacled tanager also resembles the ochre-breasted tanager, but that bird has a pale eye and the underparts are more ochraceous. The three species do not share common ranges; the lemon-spectacled tanager is native to western Colombia and northwestern Ecuador, the ochre-breasted tanager occurs at higher elevations, and the olive tanager occurs further south in the eastern foothills of the Andes in southern Colombia, Peru and Bolivia, with a disjunct population in Central America.

== Ecology ==
The lemon-spectacled tanager frequents the understorey of lowland wet forests and forest edges, seldom moving above 800 m (2,600 ft) and usually staying below 400 m (1,300 ft). It often occurs in groups of up to four birds, but sometimes forms part of small mixed flocks where it often appears to be the flock leader. It is a noisy species with a loud call, often a rapidly repeated "treu-treu-treu-treu". It feeds on insects and some plant matter.

== Status ==
The International Union for Conservation of Nature has rated this bird as being of "least concern". Its population has not been quantified and may be declining slightly, but the bird has a very wide range and does not meet the criteria for being listed in a more-threatened category.
