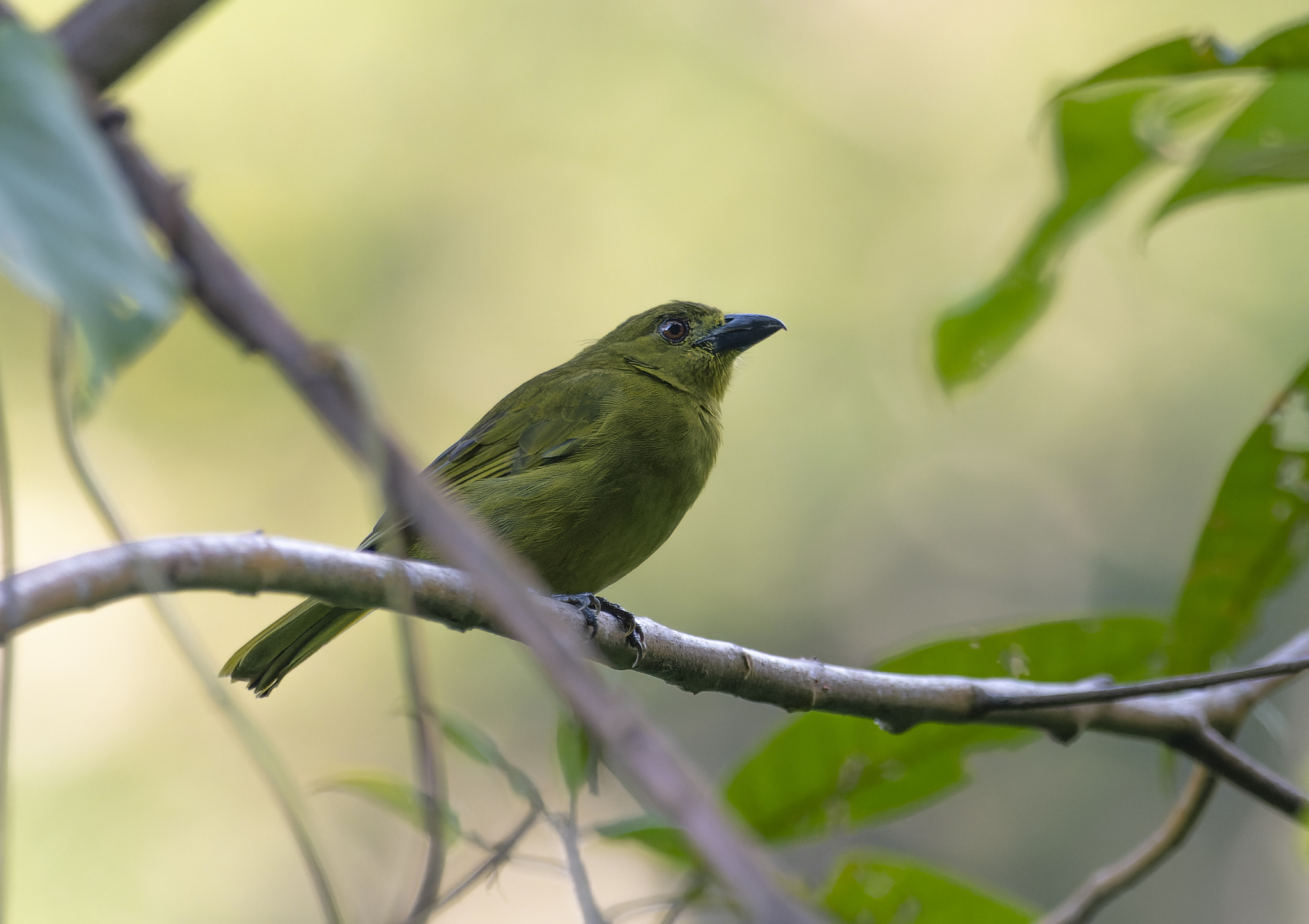

Conservation status
- Least Concern (IUCN 3.1)

Scientific classification
- Kingdom: Animalia
- Phylum: Chordata
- Class: Aves
- Order: Passeriformes
- Family: Cardinalidae
- Genus: Chlorothraupis
- Species: C. frenata

Binomial name
- Chlorothraupis frenata Berlepsch, 1907
- Approximate range

= Yellow-lored tanager =

Species of bird

The yellow-lored tanager (Chlorothraupis frenata), also known as the olive tanager, is a species of bird in the cardinal family Cardinalidae that is found in South America along the eastern foothills of the Andes from southern Colombia to western Bolivia. It was formerly considered to be conspecific with Carmiol's tanager of Central America.

== Taxonomy ==
The yellow-lored tanager was formally described in 1907 by the German ornithologist Hans von Berlepsch from a specimen collected in the Marcapata District of eastern Peru. He considered his specimen as a subspecies of Carmiol's tanager and coined the trinomial name Chlorothraupis carmioli frenata. The epithet frenata is from Latin frenatus meaning "bridled". The yellow-lored tanager is now treated as a separate species. The species is monotypic: no subspecies are recognised.

== Description ==
The yellow-lored tanager is about 17 cm (6.7 in) in overall length. The upper parts are a dull olive green and the underparts are a rather paler olive green. The throat is slightly yellower than the rest of the underparts, and is streaked in the male while being a uniform pale yellow in the female. The underparts of the female are paler than those of the male, and the female has a yellowish patch in front of the eyes. The beak is relatively stout and is black in both sexes.

== Behaviour ==
The yellow-lored tanager sometimes forms small groups of 3-4 individuals. It eats arthropods and fruit.

== Status ==
The population of this bird has not been quantified but the total number of birds is thought to be declining. However, the bird has a very large range and the International Union for Conservation of Nature considers its conservation status to be of "least concern".
