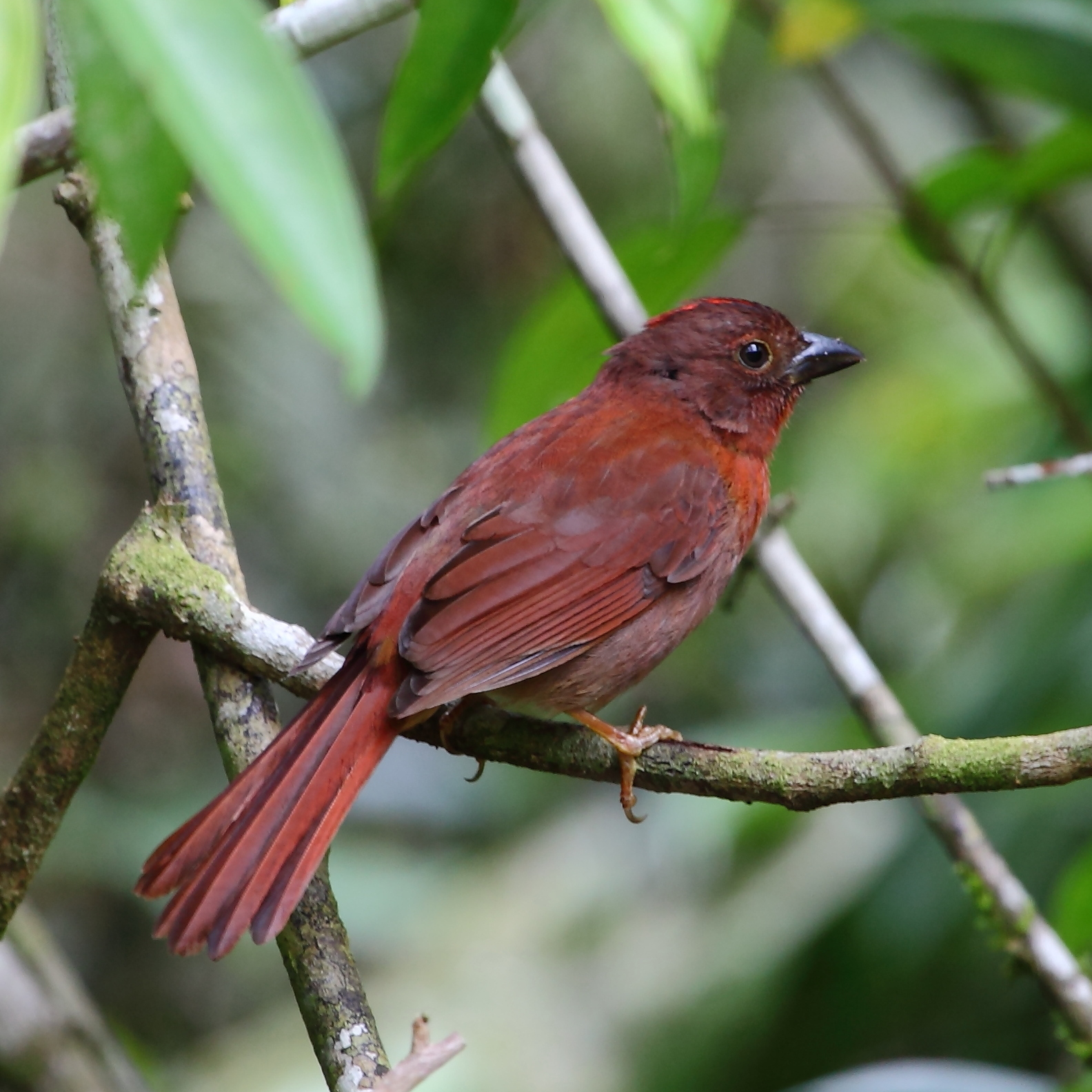
- Male at Bertioga, São Paulo State, Brazil
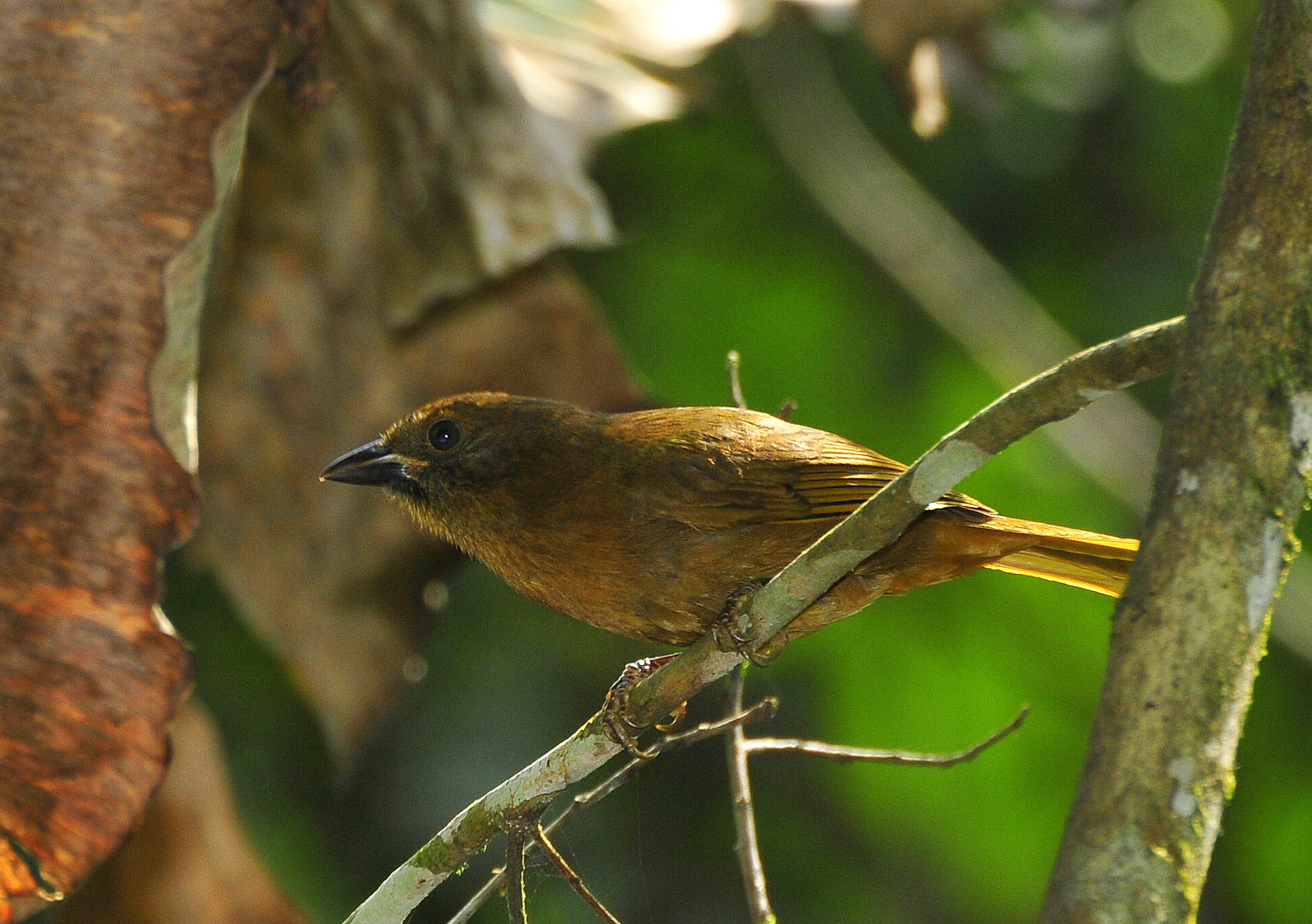
- Female at Miracatu, São Paulo State, Brazil

Conservation status
- Least Concern (IUCN 3.1)

Scientific classification
- Kingdom: Animalia
- Phylum: Chordata
- Class: Aves
- Order: Passeriformes
- Family: Cardinalidae
- Genus: Habia; Blyth, 1840
- Species: H. rubica

Binomial name
- Habia rubica (Vieillot, 1817)

= Red-crowned ant tanager =

Species of bird

The red-crowned ant tanager (Habia rubica) is a medium-sized passerine bird from tropical America. It is the only species now placed in the genus Habia. This species was long placed with the tanagers (Thraupidae), but it is actually closer to the cardinals (Cardinalidae).

== Taxonomy ==
The red-crowned ant tanager was formally described in 1817 by the French ornithologist Louis Pierre Vieillot. He placed it in the genus Saltator (which he misspelled as Staltator) and coined the binomial name Saltator rubicus. He specified the locality as Paraguay. The specific epithet is from Medieval Latin rubicus meaning "reddish". The red-crowned ant tanager is now the only species placed in the genus Habia that was introduced in 1840 by Edward Blyth. The genus name is a word used for various finches and tanagers in the Guarani language of Paraguay.

There are 17 recognised subspecies:

- H. r. holobrunnea Griscom, 1930 – east Mexico
- H. r. rosea (Nelson, 1898) – southwest Mexico
- H. r. affinis (Nelson, 1897) – south Oaxaca (south Mexico)
- H. r. nelsoni (Ridgway, 1902) – Yucatán Peninsula (southeast Mexico)
- H. r. rubicoides (Lafresnaye, 1844) – central south, south Mexico to Honduras and El Salvador
- H. r. vinacea (Lawrence, 1867) – west Costa Rica and Panama
- H. r. alfaroana (Ridgway, 1905) – northwest Costa Rica
- H. r. perijana Phelps, WH & Phelps, WH Jr, 1957 – north Colombia and northwest Venezuela
- H. r. coccinea (Todd, 1919) – central north Colombia and west Venezuela
- H. r. crissalis Parkes, 1969 – northeast Venezuela
- H. r. rubra (Vieillot, 1819) – Trinidad
- H. r. mesopotamia Parkes, 1969 – east Venezuela
- H. r. rhodinolaema (Salvin & Godman, 1883) – east Colombia, east Ecuador, northeast Peru and northwest Brazil
- H. r. peruviana (Taczanowski, 1884) – east Peru, west Brazil and north Bolivia
- H. r. hesterna Griscom & Greenway, 1937 – central Brazil
- H. r. bahiae Hellmayr, 1936 – east Brazil
- H. r. rubica (Vieillot, 1817) – east Paraguay, southeast Brazil and northeast Argentina

== Description ==
The red-crowned ant tanagers is 17–19 cm (6.7–7.5 in) long and weighs 28–43 g (0.99–1.52 oz) (male) or 23–37 g (0.81–1.31 oz) (female). The adult male of the nominate subspecies is dull reddish brown with a brighter red throat and breast. The black-bordered scarlet crown stripe is raised when the bird is excited. The female is yellowish brown with a yellow throat and yellow-buff crown stripe.

It is a shy but noisy bird. Its call is a rattle followed by a musical pee-pee-pee.

== Distribution and habitat ==
This bird is a resident breeder from Mexico south to Paraguay and northern Argentina, and on Trinidad. Common in its wide range, it is not considered threatened by the IUCN. It favors the middle stratum of the forest as well as undergrowth rich in ferns, shrubs and herbs.

== Behavior ==
=== Food and feeding ===
These birds are found in pairs or family groups. They eat mainly arthropods, but berries are also taken. In Central America and Trinidad they frequently attend army ant columns, and in the lowland forests of southeastern Brazil they may be a nuclear species of understory mixed-species feeding flocks – though further uphill, e.g. in the Serra de Paranapiacaba, they seem to join such flocks only rarely and prefer to follow the ants on their own. They also follow South American coatis (Nasua nasua) on their feeding excursions, namely in the dry season. In both cases, they are commensales, snatching invertebrate prey startled by the ants or coatis.

=== Breeding ===
The shallow cup nest is built by the female. It is usually placed in a sapling or tree fern near a stream. The normal clutch is two to three brown-blotched white eggs. These are incubated by the female for 13–14 days prior to hatching. The chicks are fed by both parents and leave the nest when about ten days old, before they are able to fly. They then hop around and hide in thick foliage.
