= Grosbeak =

Form taxon of passerine birds

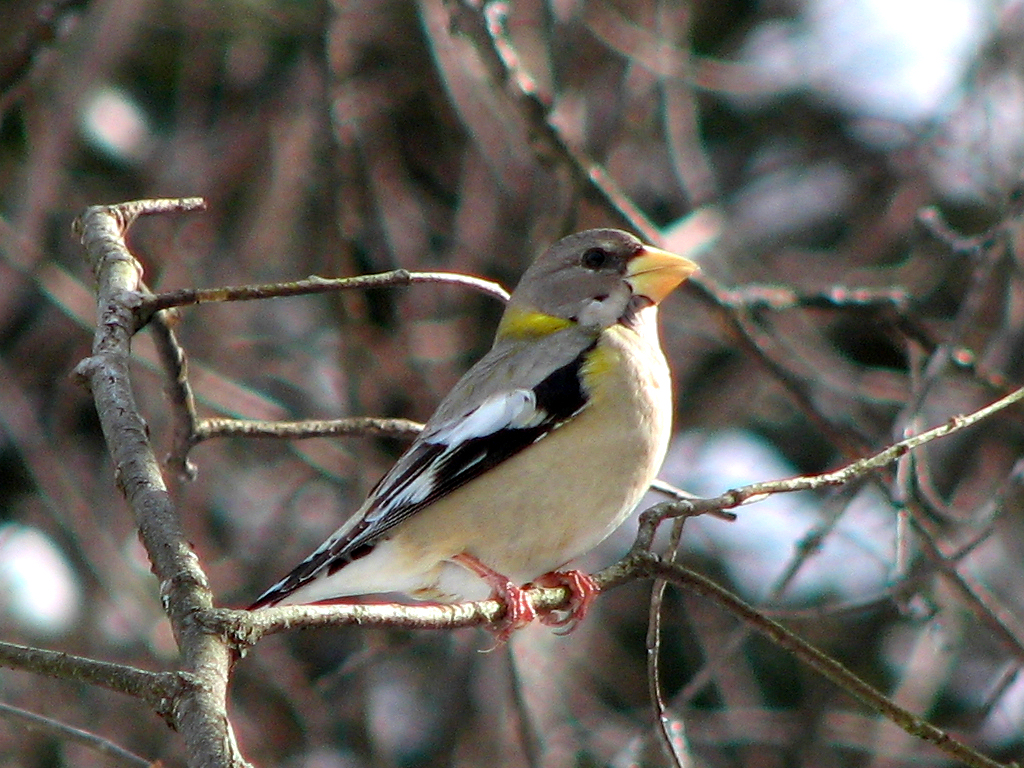
This female evening grosbeak (Hesperiphona vespertina) is considered to be a "typical" grosbeak.

Grosbeak /ˈɡroʊsbiːk/ is a form taxon containing various species of seed-eating passerine birds with large beaks. Although they all belong to the superfamily Passeroidea, these birds are not part of a natural group but rather a polyphyletic assemblage of distantly related songbirds. Some are cardueline finches in the family Fringillidae, while others are cardinals in the family Cardinalidae; one is a member of the weaver family Ploceidae. The word "grosbeak", first applied in the late 1670s, is a partial translation of the French grosbec, where gros means "large" and bec means "beak".

The following is a list of grosbeak species, arranged in groups of closely related genera. These genera are more closely related to smaller-billed birds than to other grosbeaks. Exceptions are the three genera of "typical grosbeak finches", which form a group of closest living relatives and might thus be considered the "true" grosbeaks.

== Grosbeak finches ==
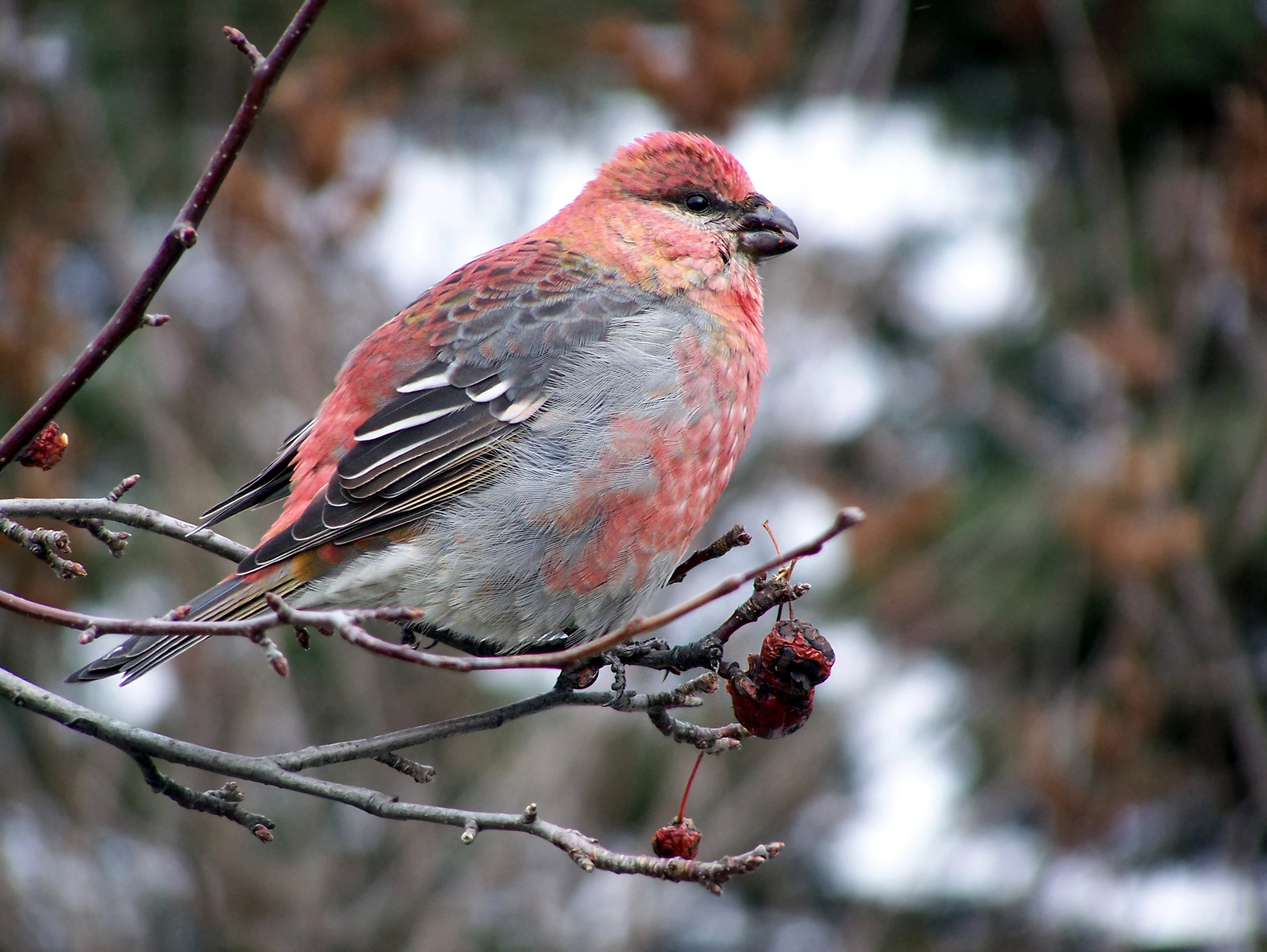
Pine grosbeak, Pinicola enucleator

The finch family (Fringillidae) contains 13 living species named "grosbeak", which are all part of the large subfamily Carduelinae:

=== Typical grosbeak finches ===
- The two Nearctic species in the genus Hesperiphona (formerly in Coccothraustes):
  - Evening grosbeak, H. vespertina
  - Hooded grosbeak, H. abeillei
- The two species in the East Asian genus Eophona:
  - Japanese grosbeak, E. personata
  - Chinese grosbeak or yellow-billed grosbeak, E. migratoria
- The four species in the South Asian genus Mycerobas:
  - Black-and-yellow grosbeak, M. icterioides
  - Collared grosbeak, M. affinis
  - Spot-winged grosbeak, M. melanozanthos
  - White-winged grosbeak, M. carnipes
- Hawfinch (also called the European grosbeak)
  - Hawfinch C.coccothraustes

=== Grosbeak bullfinch ===
- The pine grosbeak, Pinicola enucleator, a Holarctic pine forest species

=== Grosbeak goldfinches ===
- The three golden-winged grosbeaks in the genus Rhynchostruthus, found in Somaliland, mountains of south-west Arabia and on the island of Socotra and often considered a single species:
  - Somali golden-winged grosbeak, R. louisae
  - Arabian golden-winged grosbeak, R. percivali
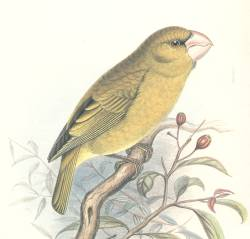
    Kona grosbeak (Chloridops kona)
  - Socotra golden-winged grosbeak, R. socotranus

=== Genus Crithagra ===
- Two species in the genus Crithagra are named "grosbeak-canaries" and one is called a grosbeak:
  - The São Tomé grosbeak, Crithagra concolor (formerly Neospiza concolor), a critically endangered restricted-range endemic found only in forests on the island of São Tomé off the West African coast, believed extinct until rediscovered in 1991
  - The northern grosbeak-canary or Abyssinian grosbeak-canary, Crithagra donaldsoni
  - The Southern grosbeak-canary or Kenya grosbeak-canary, Crithagra buchanani

=== Extinct species ===
- In addition, there are two extinct Fringillidae "grosbeaks":
  - The Bonin grosbeak (Chaunoproctus ferreorostris), found only on the Ogasawara Islands, which was last recorded in 1832. Its relationships are obscure, but it was probably another member of the cardueline finches.
  - The Kona grosbeak or grosbeak finch (Chloridops kona), last recorded in 1896. It was a Hawaiian honeycreeper, subfamily Drepanidinae.

== Cardinal-grosbeaks ==
The cardinal family (Cardinalidae) of the Americas contains the following 17 "grosbeaks":

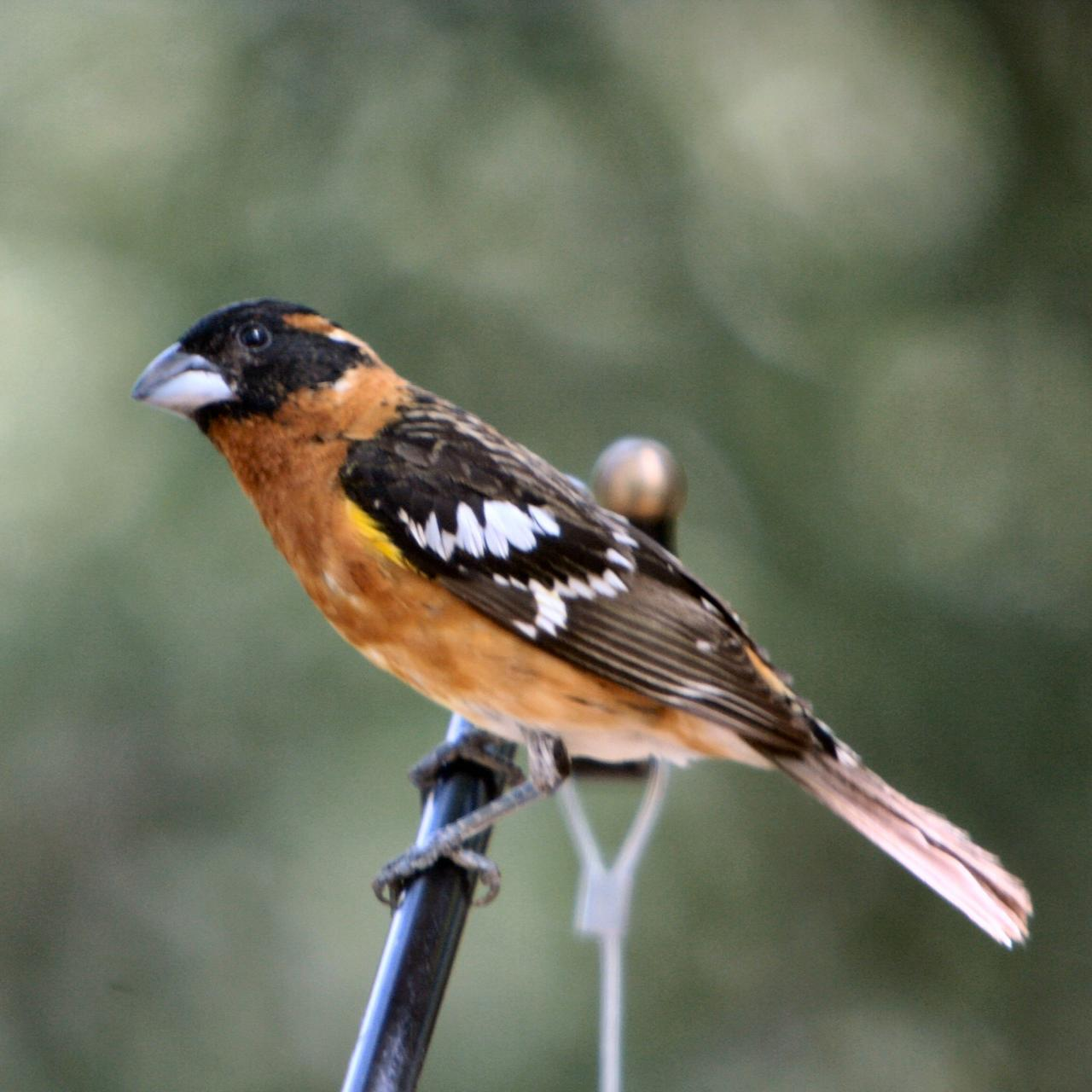
Black-headed grosbeak (Pheucticus melanocephalus)

=== Typical cardinal-grosbeaks ===
- The six species in the genus Pheucticus, ranging from the United States to Bolivia and northern Chile
  - Mexican yellow grosbeak, P. chrysopeplus
  - Southern yellow grosbeak, P. chrysogaster
  - Black-thighed grosbeak, P. tibialis, a restricted-range endemic found only in the highlands of Costa Rica and Panama
  - Black-backed grosbeak, P. aureoventris
  - Rose-breasted grosbeak, P. ludovicianus
  - Black-headed grosbeak, P. melanocephalus

=== Masked cardinal-grosbeaks ===
- The red-and-black grosbeak, Periporphyrus erythromelas of northern South America
- The two species in the Neotropical genus Caryothraustes:
  - Black-faced grosbeak, C. poliogaster
  - Yellow-green grosbeak, C. canadensis
- The crimson-collared grosbeak, Rhodothraupis celaeno, a restricted-range endemic found only in eastern Mexico

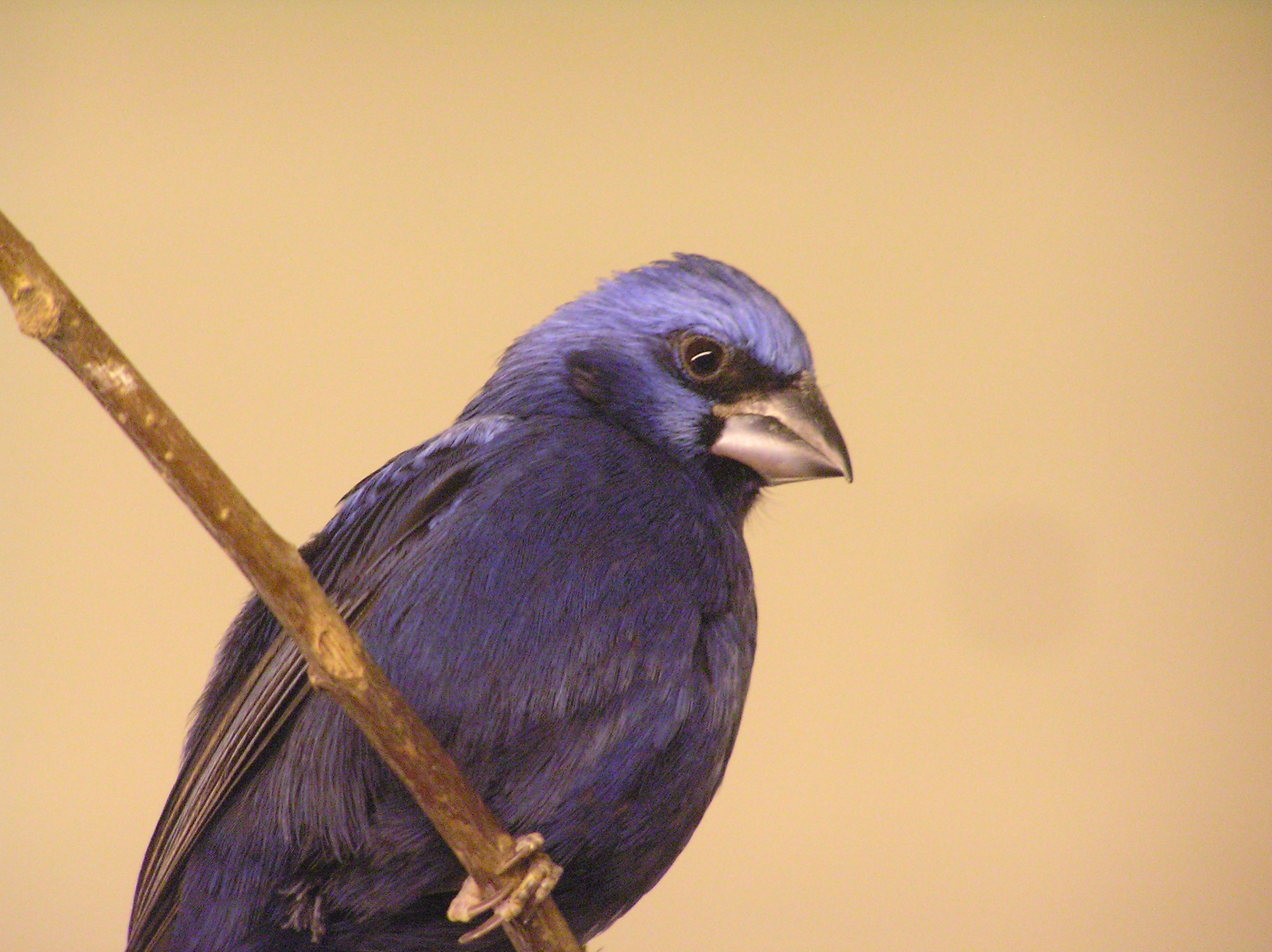
Ultramarine grosbeak (Cyanocompsa brissonii)

=== Blue cardinal-grosbeaks ===
- Two species in the Neotropical genus Cyanocompsa which also contains the blue bunting (C. parellina):
  - Ultramarine grosbeak, C. brissonii
  - Blue-black grosbeak, C. cyanoides
- The glaucous-blue grosbeak (Cyanoloxia glaucocaerulea) of eastern South America
- One species (sometimes separated in Guiraca) in the genus Passerina, which also contains the North American buntings:
  - Blue grosbeak, Passerina caerulea

== Grosbeak tanagers ==
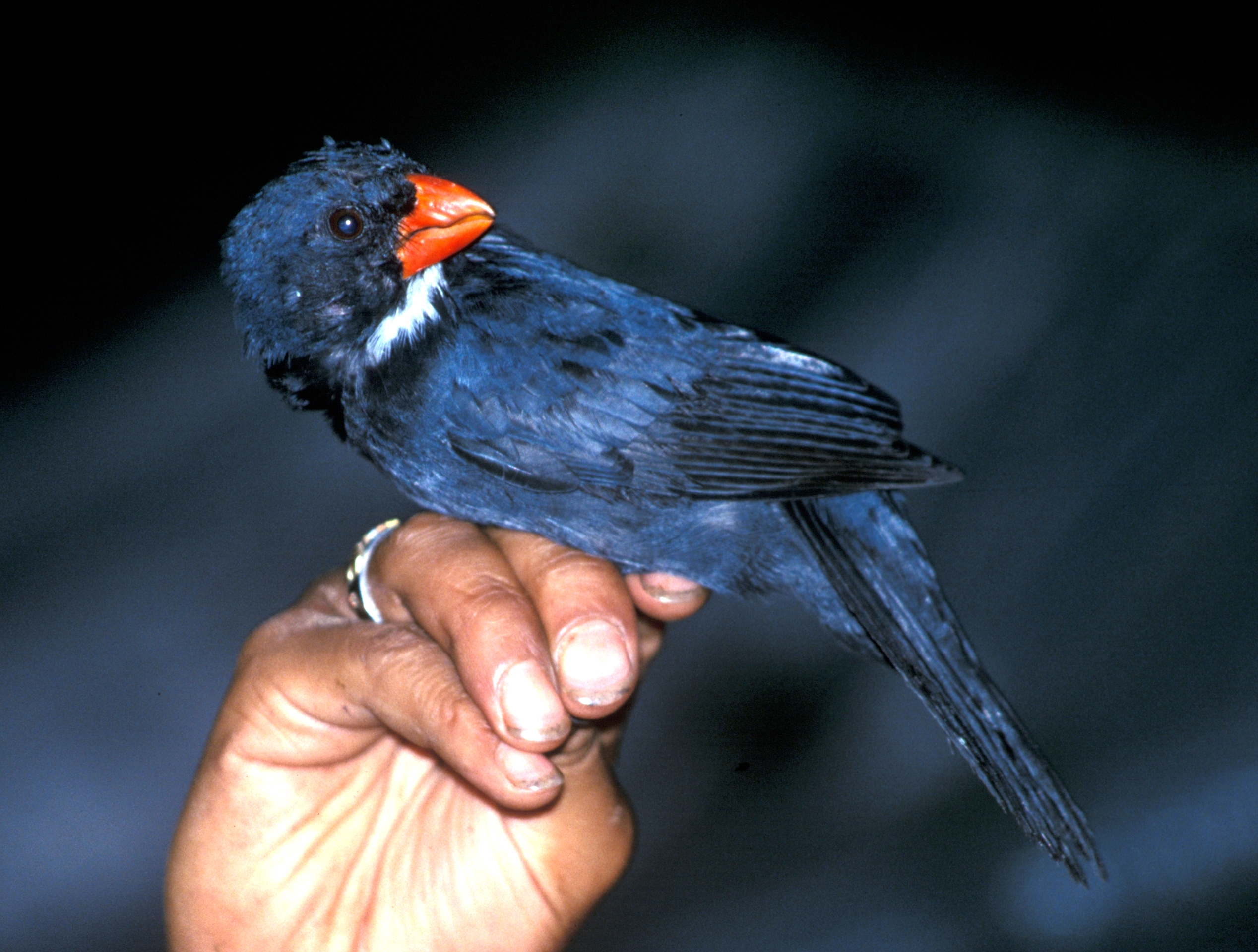
Slate-coloured grosbeak (Saltator grossus)

Three additional species of "grosbeaks" have long been placed in the Cardinalidae, but actually seem to be closer to the tanager family (Thraupidae):

- Two species in the Neotropical genus Saltator, which also contains the saltators:
  - Slate-coloured grosbeak, S. grossus
  - Black-throated grosbeak, S. fuliginosus
- The yellow-shouldered grosbeak, Parkerthraustes humeralis of South America

== Thick-billed weaver ==
Finally, the weaver family (Ploceidae) contains a species called the thick-billed weaver (Amblyospiza albifrons).
