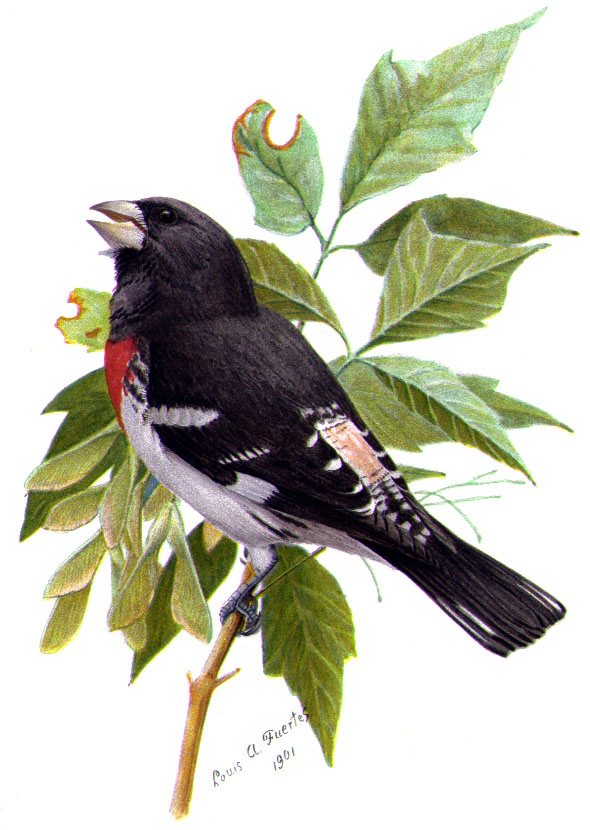
- Rose-breasted grosbeak (Pheucticus ludovicianus)

Scientific classification
- Kingdom: Animalia
- Phylum: Chordata
- Class: Aves
- Order: Passeriformes
- Family: Cardinalidae
- Genus: Pheucticus; Reichenbach, 1850

Type species
- Pitylus aureoventris d'Orbigny & Lafresnaye, 1837

Species
- See text

= Pheucticus =

Genus of birds

Pheucticus is a genus of grosbeaks containing six species.

The genus was introduced by the German naturalist Ludwig Reichenbach in 1850. The type species was subsequently designated as the black-backed grosbeak.

== Species ==
The name of the genus is from the Ancient Greek φευκτικός (pheuktikós), meaning "shy" or "inclined to avoid".

Genus Pheucticus – Reichenbach, 1850 – six species
| Common name | Scientific name and subspecies | Range | Size and ecology | IUCN status and estimated population |
|---|---|---|---|---|
| Yellow grosbeak | Pheucticus chrysopeplus (Vigors, 1832) | Pacific slope of Mexico from central Sonora to northwestern Oaxaca, and in southern Chiapas and Guatemala | Size: Habitat: Diet: | LC |
| Black-thighed grosbeak | Pheucticus tibialis Lawrence, 1867 | Costa Rica and western Panama. | Size: Habitat: Diet: | LC |
| Golden grosbeak | Pheucticus chrysogaster (Lesson, 1832) | Colombia, Ecuador, Peru, Trinidad and Tobago, and Venezuela | Size: Habitat: Diet: | LC |
| Black-backed grosbeak | Pheucticus aureoventris (d'Orbigny & Lafresnaye, 1837) Five subspecies: P. a. meridensis Riley, 1905; P. a. uropygialis Sclater, PL & Salvin, 1871; P. a. crissalis Sclater, PL & Salvin, 1877; P. a. terminalis Chapman, 1919; P. a. aureoventris (d'Orbigny & Lafresnaye, 1837) | Argentina, Brazil, Bolivia, Colombia, Ecuador, Paraguay, Peru, and Venezuela. | Size: Habitat: Diet: | LC |
| Rose-breasted grosbeak Male Female | Pheucticus ludovicianus (Linnaeus, 1766) | east of the Rocky Mountains, to winter from central-southern Mexico through Central America and the Caribbean to Peru and Venezuela. | Size: Habitat: Diet: | LC |
| Black-headed grosbeak Male Female | Pheucticus melanocephalus (Swainson, 1827) | US Great Plains and from southwestern Canada to the mountains of Mexico. | Size: Habitat: Diet: | LC |
