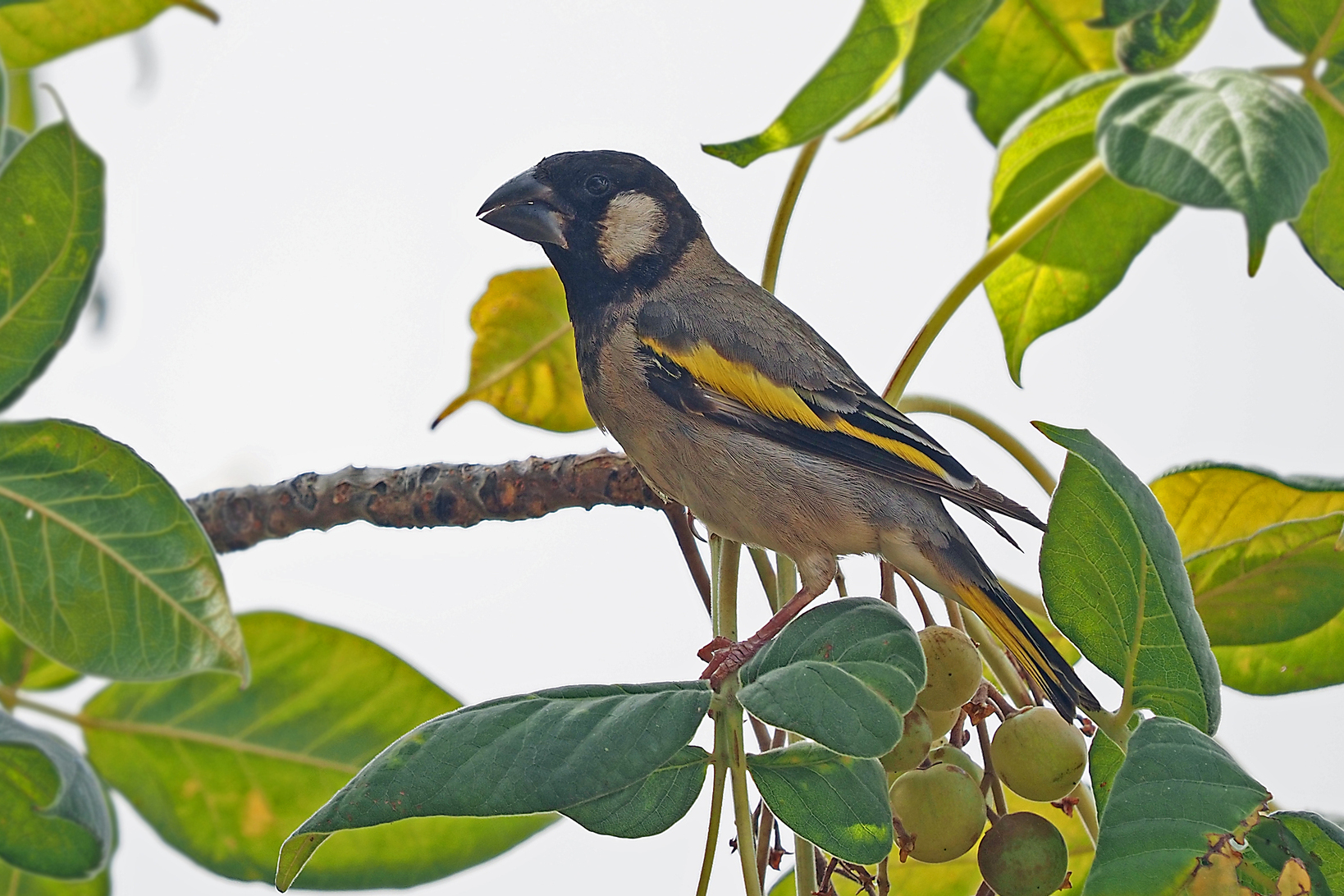
- Socotra grosbeak, Rhynchostruthus socotranus

Scientific classification
- Kingdom: Animalia
- Phylum: Chordata
- Class: Aves
- Order: Passeriformes
- Family: Fringillidae
- Subfamily: Carduelinae
- Genus: Rhynchostruthus; P.L. Sclater & Hartlaub, 1881

Type species
- Rhynchostruthus socotranus P.L. Sclater & Hartlaub, 1881

Species
- Rhynchostruthus louisae Rhynchostruthus percivali Rhynchostruthus socotranus

= Golden-winged grosbeak =

Golden-winged grosbeaks

Genus of birds

The genus Rhynchostruthus is a small group of finches in the family Fringillinae. Commonly known as golden-winged grosbeaks, they are attractive, chunky, medium-sized, robust-billed songbirds restricted to the southern Arabian and northern Somalian regions.

These elusive birds are typically found between 1,060 and 2,800 metres ASL in forested wadis and areas of scrub. The fruits of junipers, acacias and spurges appear to form the bulk of their diet.

== Description ==
These birds have slight sexual dichromatism. Males are grey-brown overall with a black bill, dark mask, white cheeks, and large, bright yellow patches on the wings and tail. The extent of the dark head-pattern and white cheek-patches varies considerably between taxa. The females are similar to the males though somewhat duller, and the juveniles are rather streaky and lack the adults' distinctive head pattern.

== Systematics ==
The large bill suggests a relationship with the Asian grosbeaks - e.g. Mycerobas - but its song and calls are reminiscent of European goldfinch Carduelis carduelis, European greenfinch C. chloris, and Yemen linnet C. yemenensis. Also it has been observed performing a greenfinch-like slow-winged display flight which suggests its true affinities may lie within the genus Carduelis. Altogether, Rhynchostruthus seems to belong to a group of Carduelinae which includes such birds as Carduelis, the oriole finch (Linurgus olivaceus), and the canaries, many of which have large amounts of brilliant yellow plumage. But the exact placement of the golden-winged grosbeaks is not very well resolved. Molecular genetic studies have shown that Rhynchostruthus and Rhodospiza form a distinct clade but are not closely related to any other of the birds commonly referred to as "grosbeaks".

The genus used to contain a single species, Rhynchostruthus socotranus but more recently this is often split into the following three species:

Image	Common name	Scientific name
	Socotra golden-winged grosbeak	Rhynchostruthus socotranus
	Arabian golden-winged grosbeak	Rhynchostruthus percivali
	Somali golden-winged grosbeak	Rhynchostruthus louisae
