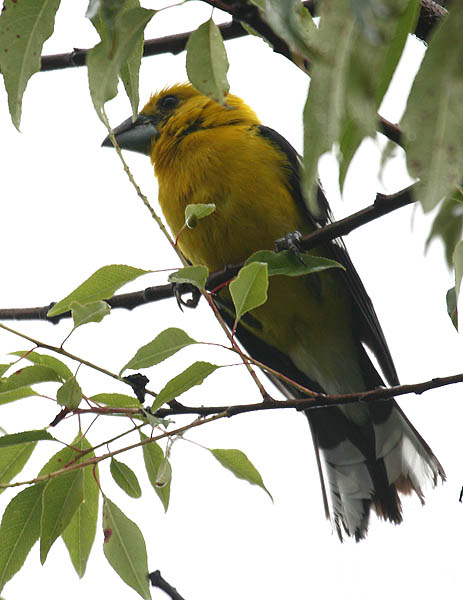
- Male in Ecuador

Conservation status
- Least Concern (IUCN 3.1)

Scientific classification
- Kingdom: Animalia
- Phylum: Chordata
- Class: Aves
- Order: Passeriformes
- Family: Cardinalidae
- Genus: Pheucticus
- Species: P. chrysogaster

Binomial name
- Pheucticus chrysogaster (Lesson, 1832)

= Golden grosbeak =

Species of bird

The golden grosbeak (Pheucticus chrysogaster) is a species of bird in the family Cardinalidae, the cardinals, grosbeaks, and “tanager” allies. It is found in Colombia, Ecuador, Peru, and Venezuela.

== Taxonomy and systematics ==
The golden grosbeak was formally described in 1832 with the binomial Pitylus chrysogaster. It is now one of six species in the genus Pheucticus. This name derives from Greek and means "shy". Some authors have treated it, the black-thighed grosbeak (P. tibialis), and the yellow grosbeak (P. chrysopeplus) as conspecific. A 2013 phylogenetic study supports their separation and suggests that the golden grosbeak is more closely related to the black-backed grosbeak (P. aureiventris) than to the black-thighed or yellow. It has also been called the golden-bellied grosbeak and southern yellow grosbeak.

The golden grosbeak has two subspecies, the nominate P. c. chrysogaster (Lesson, 1832) and P. c. labumanni (Hellmayr & Seilern, 1915).

== Description ==
The golden grosbeak is 21.5 cm (8.5 in) long and weighs about 54 to 60 g (1.9 to 2.1 oz). Adult males of the nominate subspecies have an orange-tinged deep yellow head and nape. Their back is black, their rump yellow, and their uppertail coverts black with white tips. Their wings are mostly black with wide white tips on the greater and median coverts, white bases on the primaries, and white tips on the outer webs of the secondaries and tertials. Their tail is mostly black with much white on all but the innermost two pairs of feathers. Their throat and underparts are mostly bright yellow with white undertail coverts. Their thigh feathers are black. Adult females have a dull yellow crown with heavy black streaks. Their mantle is gray-brown with a greenish tinge and the rest of their upperparts greenish yellow with blackish streaks. Their wings have about the same pattern as the male's but are mostly blackish gray with smaller areas of white. Their tail is blackish brown with small white tips on the outermost feathers. Their chin, throat, and underparts are mostly yellow with greenish yellow flanks and white undertail coverts. Juveniles have heavy black streaks on their head and upperparts and much less white on their wings than adults. Males of subspecies P. c. labumanni have thin olive-yellow edges on the scapulars and wide white edges on the outer half of most primaries. Females have brighter yellow upperparts than the nominate and the same white primary edges as the male. Both sexes of both subspecies have a dark brown iris, a massive bill with a black maxilla and a bluish gray mandible, and bluish gray legs and feet.

== Distribution and habitat ==
The golden grosbeak has a disjunct distribution; the subspecies are widely separated. Subspecies P. c. labumanni is the more northerly of the two and has a much smaller range than the nominate. It is found in northern Colombia's isolated Sierra Nevada de Santa Marta, in the Serranía del Perijá on the Colombia-Venezuela border, and discontinuously in Venezuela in northern Lara, in the Venezuelan Coastal Range from Aragua to Miranda, in the interior mountains of Aragua, and in southern Sucre and northern Monagas. The nominate is found from Nariño Department in far southwestern Colombia south along the Andes of Ecuador and Peru to Cuzco Department and also between the coast and the Andes from northern Manabí Province in Ecuador south to Arequipa Department in Peru.

The golden grosbeak inhabits a variety of generally dryish and somewhat open landscapes including the edges of forest, woodlands, scrublands, pastures and cultivated areas with some trees, and gardens. It also occurs in more humid landscapes on the eastern side of the Andes of Peru. In elevation it ranges between 950 and 2,000 m (3,100 and 6,600 ft) in Venezuela, between 1,600 and 2,800 m (5,200 and 9,200 ft) in Colombia, and from near sea level to 3,500 m (11,500 ft) in Ecuador and Peru.

== Behavior ==
=== Movement ===
The golden grosbeak is a year-round resident and believed to be sedentary.

=== Feeding ===
The golden grosbeak's diet has not been studied but is known to include insects, seeds, and berries. It usually forages singly or in pairs and takes prey and plant food from foliage, generally fairly high in the habitat. It usually does not join mixed-species feeding flocks.

=== Breeding ===
The golden grosbeak's breeding season has not been fully defined but spans April to July in northern Colombia and February to May in western Ecuador. Its nest is a shallow cup made from twigs lined with softer rootlets and plant fibers. Nests have been found between 2.8 and 4.3 m (9 and 14 ft) above the ground in bushes and trees. The clutch is two to four eggs that are deep blue-green with brown blotches. The incubation period is about 14 to 16 days; the female does most of the incubating but the male occasionally contributes. Fledging occurs about 11 days after hatch. The shiny cowbird (Molothrus bonariensis) is a frequent brood parasite.

=== Vocalization ===
One description of the golden grosbeak's song is "a liquid series of slow phrases reminiscent of a Turdus thrush but fuller and smoother"; individuals have a large repertoire. Another description calls the song "rich and melodious", a "spirited, fast caroling usually delivered from a prominent perch" and its call "a metallic pink".

== Status ==
The IUCN has assessed the golden grosbeak as being of Least Concern. It has a very large range; its population size is not known and is believed to be decreasing. No immediate threats have been identified. It is considered "uncommon and very local" (emphasis in original) in Venezuela, "local" in Colombia, and "widespread and locally common" in Ecuador. In Peru it is fairly common in the northwest, uncommon further south and on the Andes' western slope, and rare to uncommon on the eastern slope.

== Gallery ==
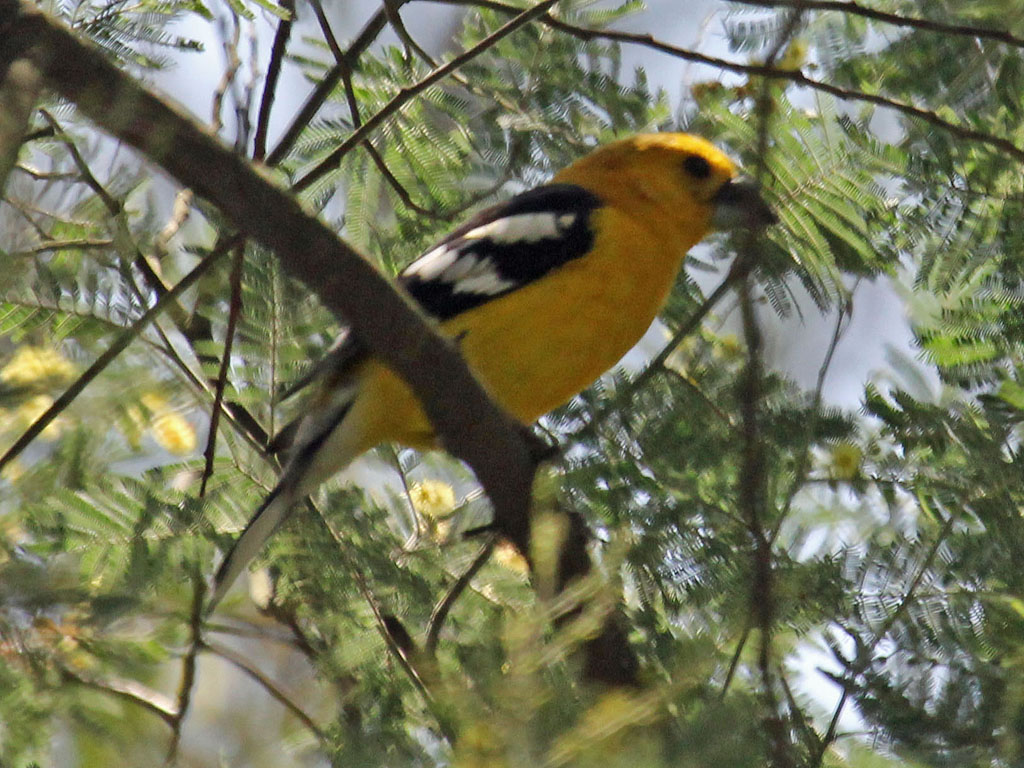

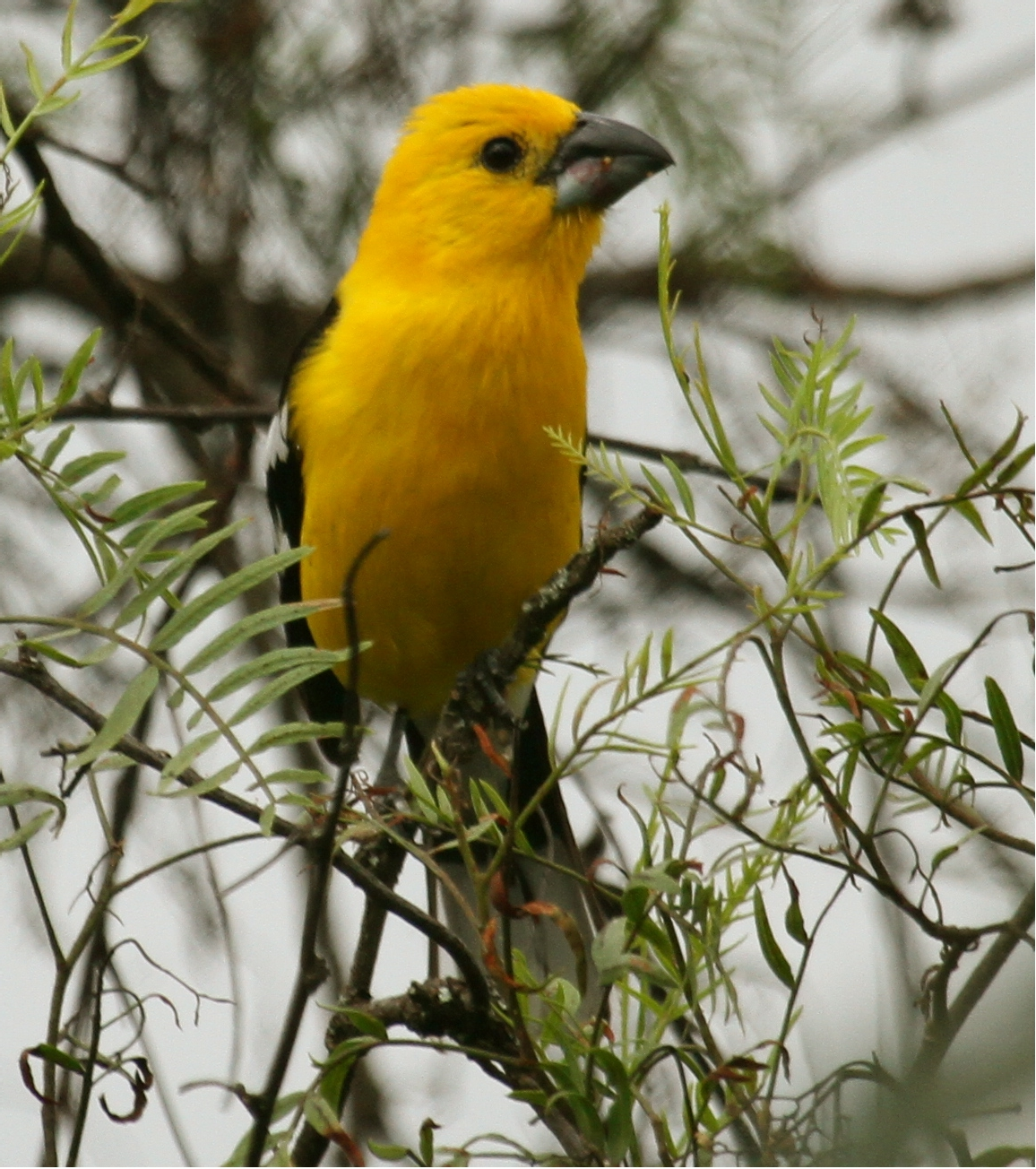

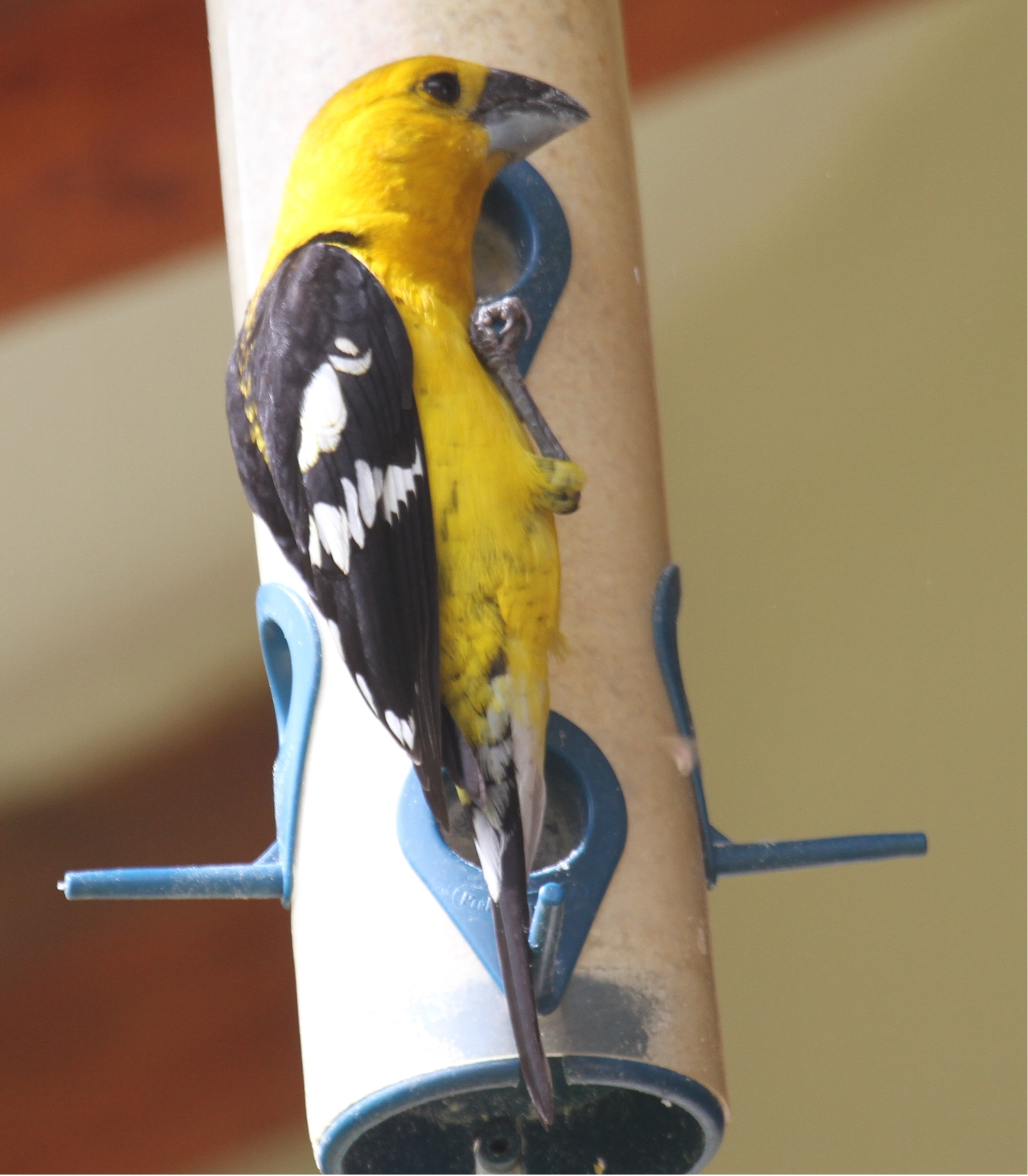
