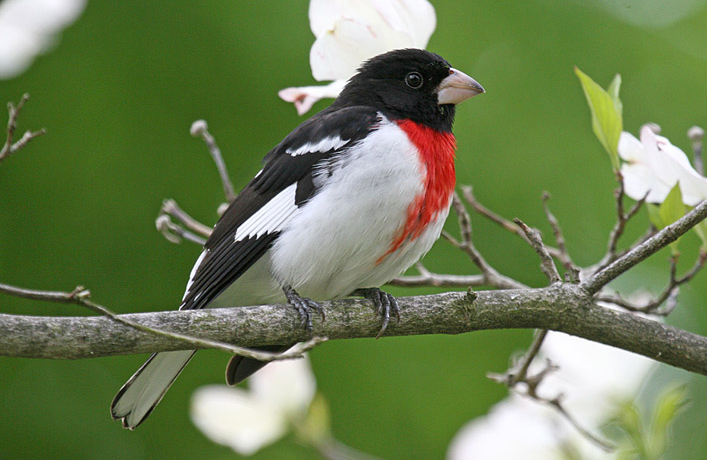

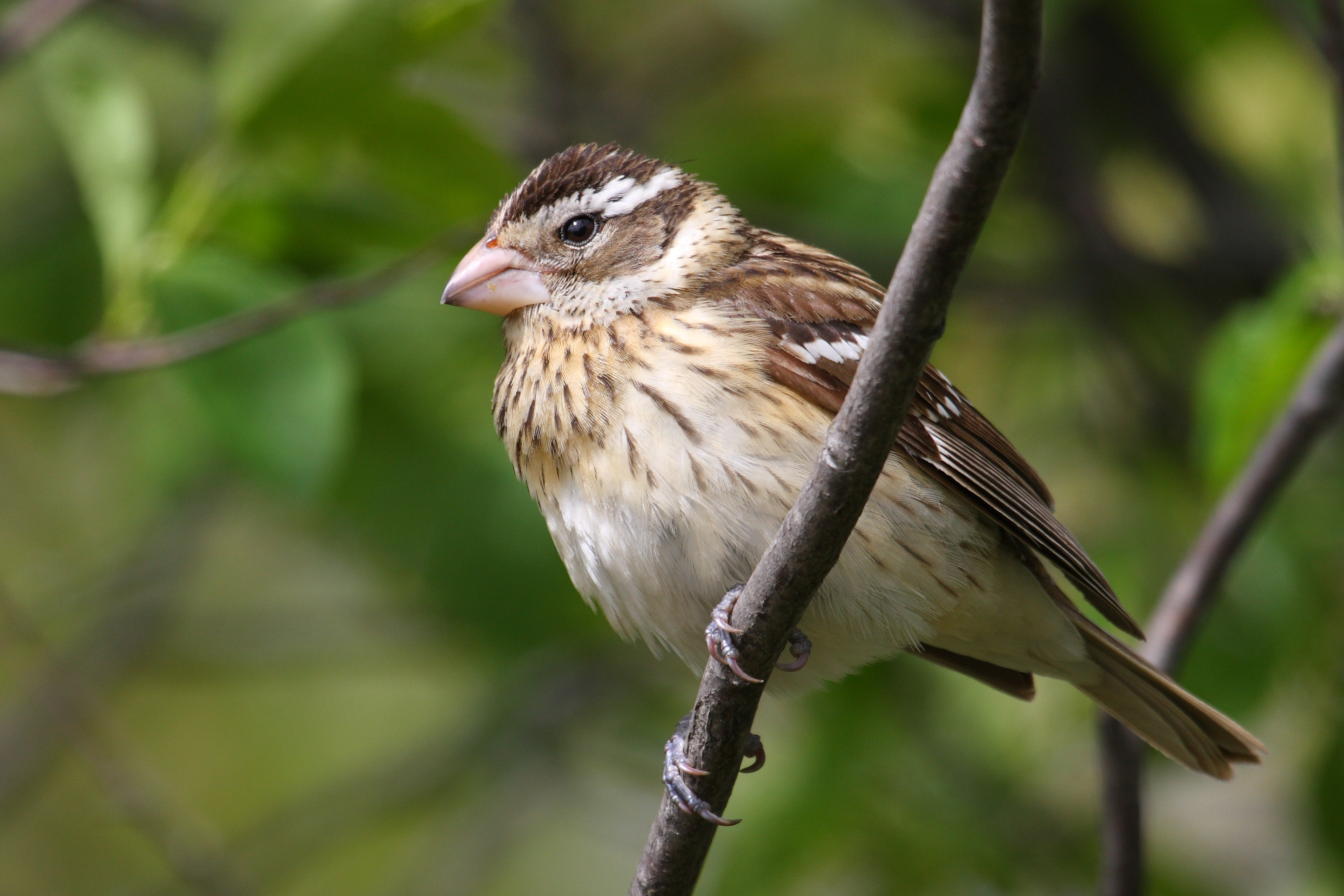
- Adult female

Conservation status
- Least Concern (IUCN 3.1)

Scientific classification
- Kingdom: Animalia
- Phylum: Chordata
- Class: Aves
- Order: Passeriformes
- Family: Cardinalidae
- Genus: Pheucticus
- Species: P. ludovicianus

Binomial name
- Pheucticus ludovicianus (Linnaeus, 1766)
- Range in northern America: Breeding range Migration only range Wintering range

Synonyms
- Loxia ludoviciana Linnaeus, 1766; Zamelodia ludoviciana (Linnaeus, 1766)

Audio

= Rose-breasted grosbeak =

Species of bird

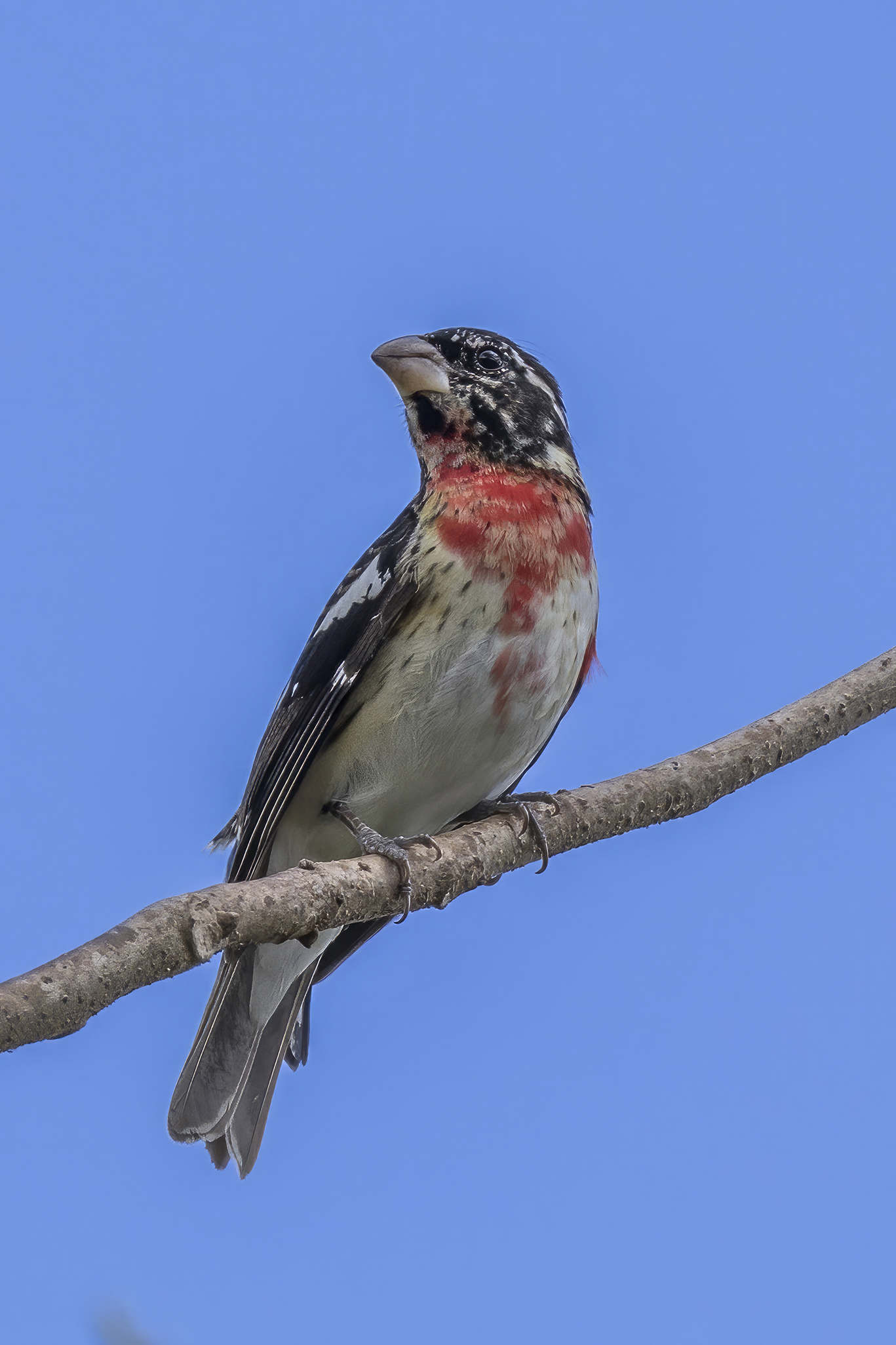
Immature male, Honduras

Pheucticus ludovicianus - Rose-breasted grosbeak

The rose-breasted grosbeak (Pheucticus ludovicianus), colloquially called "cut-throat" due to its coloration, is a large, seed-eating grosbeak in the cardinal family (Cardinalidae). It is primarily a foliage gleaner. Males have black heads, wings, backs, and tails, and a bright rose colored patch on their white breast. Males and females exhibit marked sexual dimorphism.

Breeding habitat consists of cool-temperate open deciduous woods throughout much of eastern North America, with migration to tropical America in winter. Rose-breasted grosbeaks have an average maximum lifespan of 7.3 years in the wild, and up to 24 years in captivity. Death in the wild is generally due to collision with objects (buildings, cars, etc.) and predation, to eggs, nestlings and adults.

== Taxonomy ==
In 1760 the French zoologist Mathurin Jacques Brisson included a description of the rose-breasted grosbeak in his Ornithologie based on a specimen collected in Louisiana. He used the French name Le gros-bec de la Louisiane and the Latin Coccothraustes Ludoviciana. Although Brisson coined Latin names, these do not conform to the binomial system and are not recognised by the International Commission on Zoological Nomenclature. When in 1766 the Swedish naturalist Carl Linnaeus updated his Systema Naturae for the twelfth edition, he added 240 species that had been previously described by Brisson. One of these was the rose-breasted grosbeak. Linnaeus included a brief description, coined the binomial name Loxia ludoviciana and cited Brisson's work. This species is now placed in the genus Pheucticus that was introduced by the German naturalist Ludwig Reichenbach in 1850. The species is monotypic.

The genus name Pheucticus is from Ancient Greek φευκτικός - pheuktikós, "shy", from φεύγω - pheúgo, "to flee", and the specific ludovicianus is from Neo-Latin and refers to Louisiana.

== Description ==
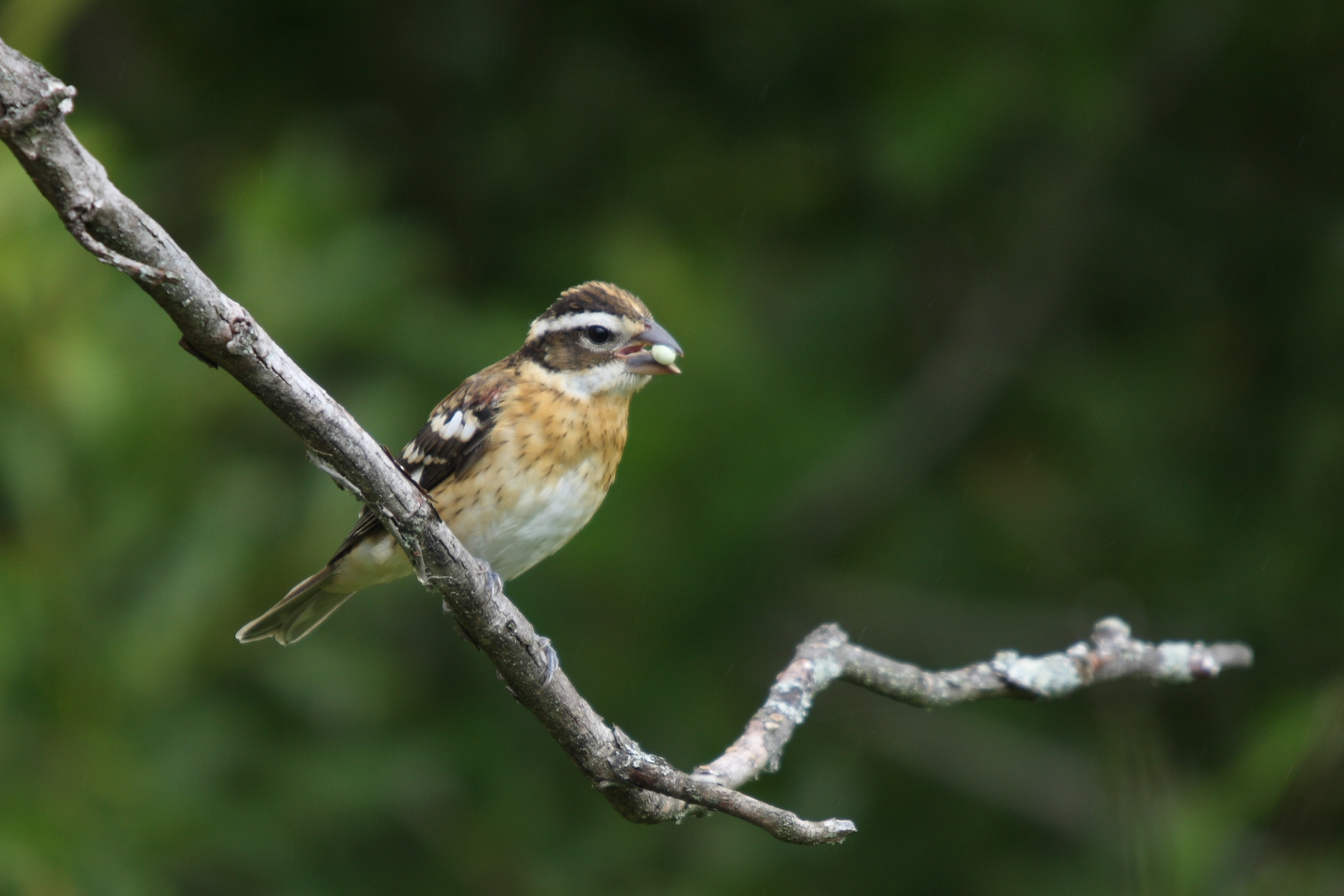
Immature male

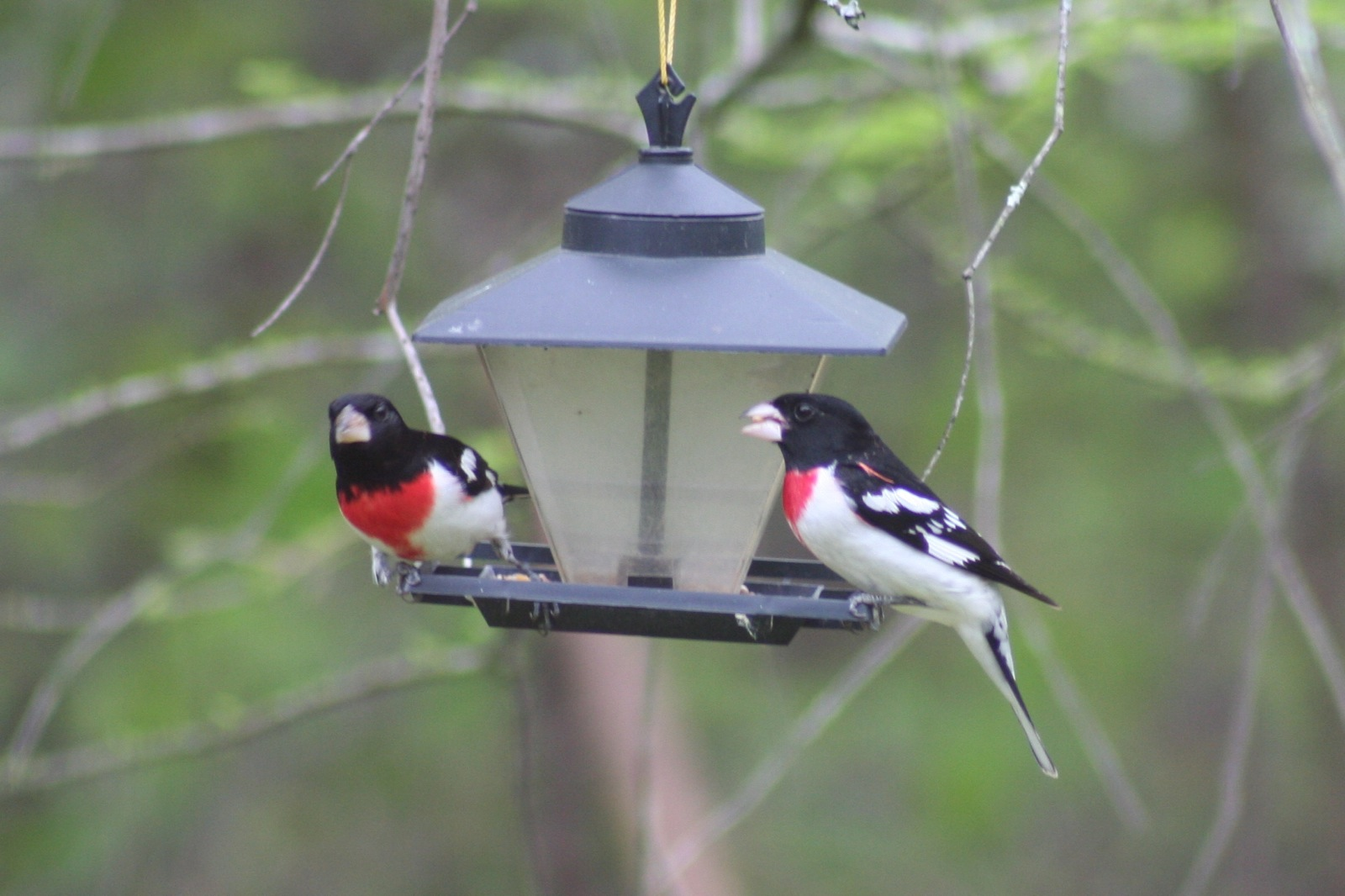
Two males at feeder

Adult birds are 18–22 cm (7.1–8.7 in) long, span 29–33 cm (11–13 in) across the wings and weigh 35–65 g (1.2–2.3 oz). Grosbeaks measured during migration in the West Indies averaged 43 g (1.5 oz), while those banded in Pennsylvania average about 45 g (1.6 oz). Very little sexual dimorphism in size is seen; females were found to be marginally smaller in standard measurements, but in some seasons were marginally heavier than males when banded in Pennsylvania. At all ages and in both sexes, the beak is dusky horn-colored, and the feet and eyes are dark.

The adult male in breeding plumage has a black head, wings, back, and tail, and a bright rose-red patch on its breast; the wings have two white patches and rose-red linings. Its underside and rump are white. Males in nonbreeding plumage have largely white underparts, supercilium, and cheeks. The upperside feathers have brown fringes, and most wing feathers white ones, giving a scaly appearance. The bases of the primary remiges are also white. The coloration renders the adult male rose-breasted grosbeak (even while wintering) unmistakable if seen well.

The adult female has dark grey-brown upperparts – darker on wings and tail – a white supercilium, a buff stripe along the top of the head, and black-streaked white underparts, which except in the center of the belly have a buff tinge. The wing linings are yellowish, and on the upperwing are two white patches like in the summer male. Immatures are similar, but with pink wing-linings and less prominent streaks and usually a pinkish-buff hue on the throat and breast. At one year of age—in their first breeding season—males are scaly above like fully adult males in winter plumage, and still retain the immature's browner wings. Unlike males, females can easily be confused with the black-headed grosbeak (Pheucticus melanocephalus) where their ranges overlap in the central United States and south-central Canada. The rose-breasted grosbeak female has slightly darker brown markings on the underside, paler rather yellowish streaking on both the head and wings and paler, pinkish (rather than bi-colored) bill when compared to the female black-headed grosbeak. A potential confusion species also is the female purple finch (Haemorhous purpureus), but that species is noticeably smaller with a less robust bill and a notched tail.

The song is a subdued mellow warbling, resembling a more refined, sweeter version of the American robin's (Turdus migratorius). Males start singing early, occasionally even when still in winter quarters. The call is a sharp pink or pick, somewhat reminiscent of a woodpecker call.

== Distribution and habitat ==
The rose-breasted grosbeak's breeding habitat is open deciduous woods across most of Canada and the northeastern United States. In particular, the northern birds migrate south through the United States east of the Rocky Mountains, to winter from central-southern Mexico through Central America and the Caribbean to Peru and Venezuela. The southern limit of its wintering range is not well known; it was, for example, only recorded in the Serranía de las Quinchas (Colombia) in the 1990s. In winter, they prefer more open woodland, or similar habitat with a loose growth of trees, such as forest edges, parks, gardens, and plantations, ranging from sea level into the hills, e.g. up to 5,000 ft (1,500 m) above mean sea level in Costa Rica. Since 1966 the rose-breasted grosbeak has experienced a greater than 1.5% yearly decline in population throughout the eastern part of its summer range, but a coincident >1.5% yearly increase in western parts of its summer range.

=== Migration ===
The first birds leave the breeding grounds as early as August, while the last ones do not return until mid-late May. In general, however, they migrate south in late September or in October, and return in late April or early May. It appears as if they remain on their breeding grounds longer today than they did in the early 20th century, when migrants were more commonly seen in May and August than in April or September. The rose-breasted grosbeak occurs as a very rare vagrant in western Europe. During breeding it is fairly territorial; in winter, it typically travels in small groups, and sometimes in larger flocks of a dozen or more.

== Behaviour and ecology ==
=== Breeding ===
Rose-breasted grosbeaks were the only one of 70 migratory songbird species in the eastern United States shown in males to have produced sperm while still far south of their breeding location. Male grosbeaks tend to arrive a few days to a week before the females and pair formation apparently occurs on the breeding grounds. Nest building begins from as early as early May in Tennessee to as late as early June further north in Saskatchewan. Egg laying may occur anytime from mid-May to mid-July, as has been recorded in Quebec. Usually only a single brood is laid by these grosbeaks each summer but second broods are suspected in Canada and confirmed in semi-captivity. Both the male and the female apparently participate in selecting and building the nest, which is on a tree branch, over vines or any elevated woody vegetation. Nests have been recorded at 0.8 to 16.7 m (2.6 to 54.8 ft) off the ground, averaging 6 m (20 ft) high, almost always in the vicinity of openings in woodlands. Nests are typical of many passerines in both construct, material and size, made from leaves, twigs, rootlets or hair. Clutches are from 1 to 5 eggs, normally being 3–4, being pale blue to green with purplish to brownish red spotting. Males do a third of the incubation roughly, the female doing the remaining amount, and incubation can last from 11 to 14 days. Nestlings are 5 g (0.18 oz) at hatching and after 3–6 days of age, they gain at least 3 g (0.11 oz) each day. The young grosbeaks typically fledge at 9–13 days of age and are independent of their parents after approximately 3 weeks.

=== Longevity and mortality ===
Maximum lifespan recorded for a wild rose-breasted grosbeak was 12 years, 11 months. Captive grosbeaks have been recorded living up to 24 years of age, making them quite a long-living passerine excluding the pressures of surviving in the wild. Although frequently targeted by the brood parasite, the brown-headed cowbird (Molothrus ater), the rose-breasted grosbeak is apparently able to recognize cowbird eggs and has been seen to aggressively displace cowbirds near the nest. Typically, fewer than 7% of grosbeak nests have cowbird eggs per one study. Per the U.S. Bird Banding Laboratory, as of 1997, rose-breasted grosbeaks recovered when dead have largely collided with objects, including buildings and cars (17.2%) or had been shot (10%; mostly before 1960), 3.6% of the fatalities were caught by cats, 0.8% caught by dogs. Mortality due to natural causes, including disease, natural predators and inclement weather go largely unreported. It is known the main cause of nesting failure is predation. Natural predators of eggs and nestlings include blue jays (Cyanocitta cristata), common grackles (Quiscalus quiscula), raccoons (Procyon lotor), gray (Sciurus carolinensis) and red (Tamiasciurus hudsonicus) squirrels. Confirmed predators of adults include both Cooper's (Astur cooperii) and sharp-shinned hawks (Accipiter striatus) as well as northern harriers (Circus cyaenus), eastern screech-owls (Megascops asio) and short-eared owls (Asio flammeus).

=== Diet ===
The rose-breasted grosbeak forages in shrubs or trees for insects, seeds and berries, also catching insects in flight and occasionally eating nectar. It usually keeps to the treetops, and only rarely can be seen on the ground. In the winter quarters, they can be attracted into parks, gardens, and possibly even to bird feeders by fruit like Trophis racemosa. They also survive on blackberries, mulberries, seeds of smartweed, pigweed, raspberries, and milkweed, in addition to sunflower seeds, garden peas, oats, wheat, tree blossoms, tree buds, and developed natural product. Other notable winter food includes jacaranda seeds and the fruits of the introduced busy Lizzy (Impatiens walleriana). In grosbeaks from the north-central United States and southern Canada, 52% of the stomach contents were comprised by invertebrates, predominantly beetles; 19.3% was made up of wild fruits; 15.7% by weed seeds; 6.5% by cultivated fruits and plants, including peas, corn (Zea mays), oats (Avena sativa) and wheat (Triticum vulgare); and the remaining 6.5% by other plant material, including tree buds and flowers.

== Status ==
Fires are necessary to maintain many kinds of grassland (see Fire ecology). Fire suppression in the late-20th century allowed forests to spread on the Great Plains into areas where recurring fires would otherwise have maintained grassland. This allowed hybridization with the black-headed grosbeak subspecies P. melanocephalus papago. Range expansions also seem to have occurred elsewhere, for example in northern Ohio, where it bred rarely if at all in the first decade of the 1900s, but it is by no means an uncommon breeder today. In general, though it requires mature woodland to breed and is occasionally caught as a cage bird, the rose-breasted grosbeak is not at all rare, and not considered a threatened species by the IUCN. Its average maximum lifespan in the wild is 7.3 years.
