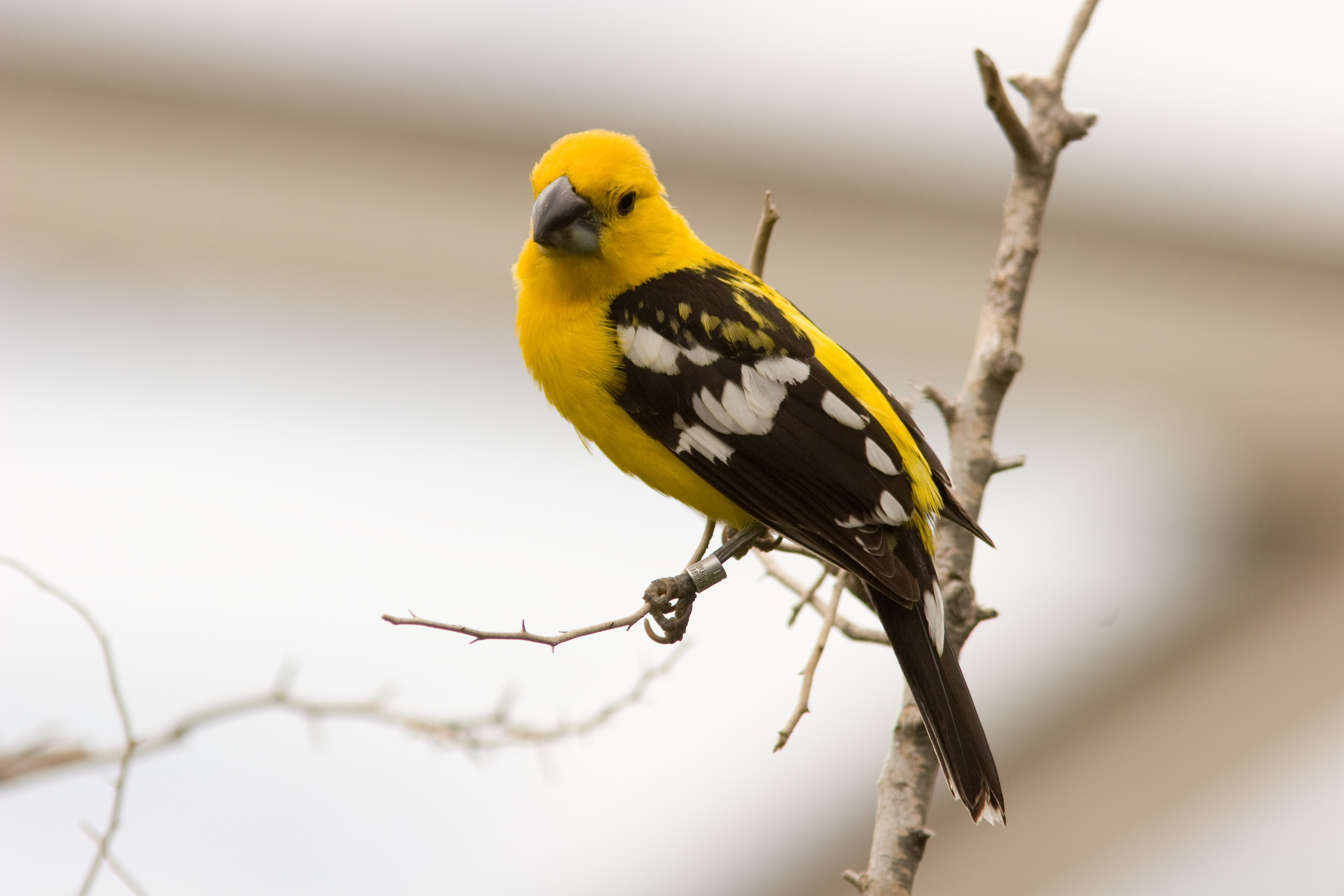
- Adult male at Burgers Zoo

Conservation status
- Least Concern (IUCN 3.1)

Scientific classification
- Kingdom: Animalia
- Phylum: Chordata
- Class: Aves
- Order: Passeriformes
- Family: Cardinalidae
- Genus: Pheucticus
- Species: P. chrysopeplus

Binomial name
- Pheucticus chrysopeplus (Vigors, 1832)
- Breeding Year-round

= Yellow grosbeak =

Species of bird

The yellow grosbeak (Pheucticus chrysopeplus) is a bird in the family Cardinalidae, the cardinals, grosbeaks, and “tanager” allies. It is found in Mexico and Guatemala. It also occurs as a vagrant in the United States.

== Taxonomy and systematics ==
The yellow grosbeak was formally described in 1832 with the binomial Cocothraustes chrysopeplus. Some authors have treated it, the black-thighed grosbeak (P. tibialis), and the golden grosbeak (P. chrysogaster) as conspecific.

The yellow grosbeak has three subspecies, the nominate P. c. chrysopeplus (Vigors, 1832), P. c. dilutus (Van Rossem, 1934), and P. c. aurantiacus (Salvin & Godman, 1891).

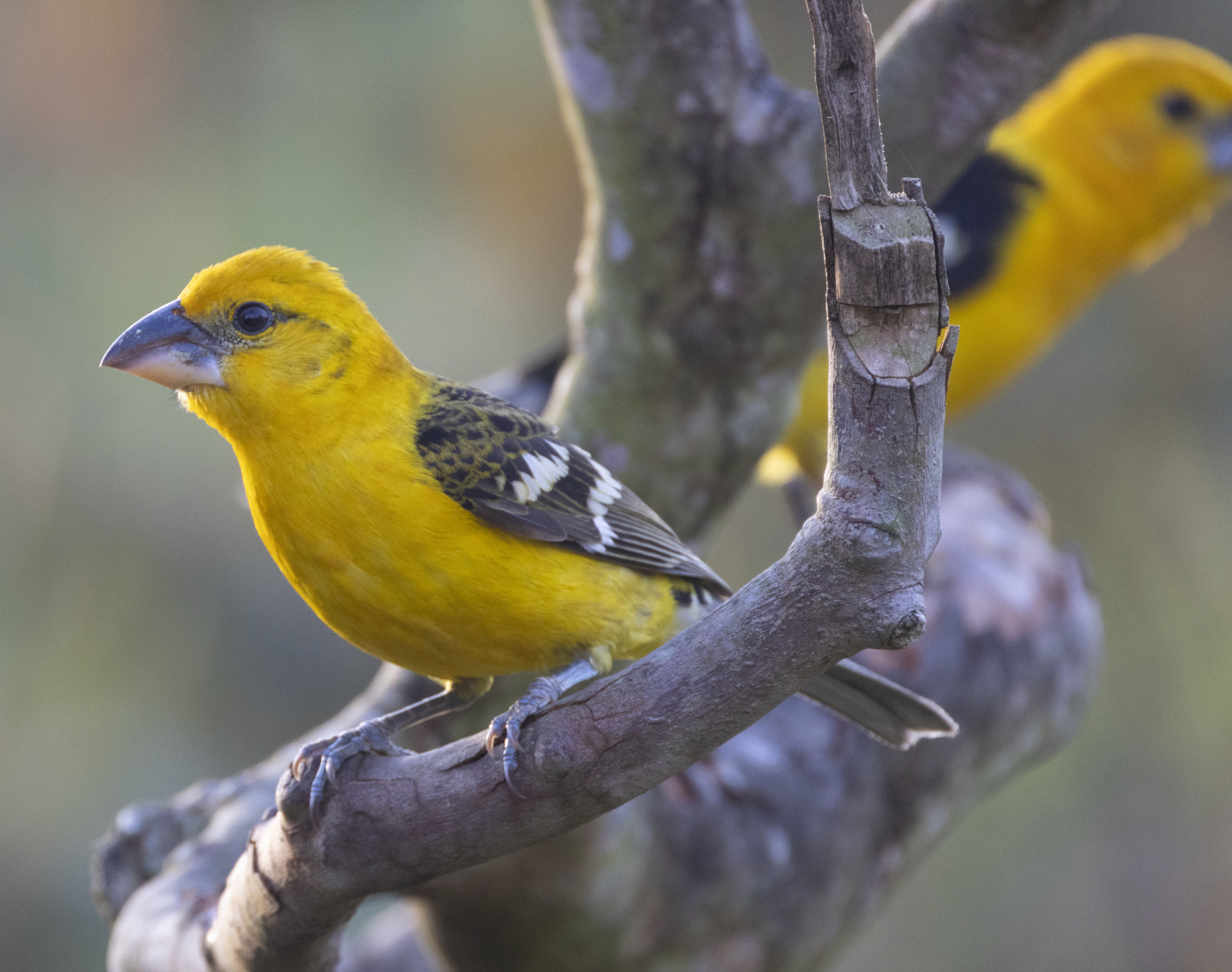
P. c. chrysopectus, Cabo Corrientes, Jalisco, Mexico

== Description ==
The yellow grosbeak is the largest member of its genus in Mexico and Central America. It is 21.5 to 24 cm (8.5 to 9.4 in) long; one female weighed 77.6 g (2.7 oz). Adult males of the nominate subspecies have a deep yellow head, nape, and breast. Their back and rump are a brighter yellow with some faint darker mottling. The sides of their mantle are black and their uppertail coverts black with wide white tips. Their wings are mostly black with wide white tips on the greater and median coverts, white bases on the primaries, and white tips on the outer webs of the secondaries and tertials. Their tail is mostly black with much white on the inner webs of the three outermost pairs of feathers. Their underparts below the deep yellow breast are mostly brighter yellow with white undertail coverts. Their thigh feathers are black. Adult females are overall duller than males. They have heavy black streaking on their crown, nape, and ear coverts. Their mantle is blackish brown with yellowish edges on the feathers. Their wings have about the same pattern as the male's but smaller areas of white. They have much less white on their tail than males and it has a brownish tinge. Juveniles resemble adult females and take two years to attain adult plumage.

Males of subspecies P. c. dilutus have a mostly black mantle with some yellow and hidden black bases on the rump feathers. Females are much duller and grayer than the nominate with heavier streaking on the upperparts, paler yellow underparts, and dusky streaks on the flanks. Males of P. c. aurantiacus are overall a deeper orange-yellow than the nominate and have the same black bases on their rump feathers as dilutus. Both sexes of all subspecies have a dark brown iris, a massive bill with a blackish maxilla and a pinkish to bluish gray mandible, and bluish gray legs and feet.

== Distribution and habitat ==
The yellow grosbeak has a disjunct distribution along the Pacific sides of Mexico and Guatemala. The range of P. c. aurantiacus is separate from the contiguous ranges of the other two subspecies. Subspecies P. c. dilutus is the northernmost. It is found in central Sonora, southwestern Chihuahua, and northern Sinaloa states in northwestern Mexico. The nominate is found in Mexico from central Sinaloa and western Durango south to northern Oaxaca. P. c. aurantiacus is found from southern Chiapas in southern Mexico intermittently into southern Guatemala. The species occurs occasionally in the U. S. state of Arizona. In addition there are documented records of birds accepted as wild as far north as Colorado and as far east as Arkansas.

The yellow grosbeak inhabits a variety of landscapes including deciduous and semi-deciduous forest, gallery forest, scrubby woodlands, and thorn forest. In Mexico it ranges in elevation between sea level and 2,500 m (8,200 ft) and in Guatemala between 300 and 1,850 m (1,000 and 6,100 ft).

== Behavior ==
=== Movement ===
The population of the yellow grosbeak in Sonora departs to the south in mid-September and usually returns in mid-May, but where it overwinters is not known. The populations south of Sonora are year-round residents.

=== Feeding ===
The yellow grosbeak's diet has not been studied but it is known to feed on fruits and nectar. It usually forages singly or in pairs and rarely joins mixed-species feeding flocks.

=== Breeding ===
The yellow grosbeak breeds in Sonora from early June until September; its breeding season elsewhere is not known. The species' nest is an open cup made from a variety of plant fibers lined with fine rootlets. It typically is placed in a dense bush "at low to medium height". The clutch is two to five eggs that are bluish green with dark flecks. Nothing else is known about the species' breeding biology.

=== Vocalization ===
One description of the yellow grosbeak's song is "a series of rich, clear whistles, chee wee chee-r weer weeuh and so on" and of its calls as a "sharp metallic plihk and a soft whistle, hoee". The last is given in flight. Another author describes the song as "a short, sweet warble...where'wee'here'weat'ta'wee-here'weat-ta'weee" and a call as "a loud, explosive Peeek!".

== Status ==
The IUCN has assessed the yellow grosbeak as being of Least Concern. It has a very large range; its estimated population of at least 50,000 mature individuals is believed to be decreasing. No immediate threats have been identified. It is considered locally fairly common in Mexico and uncommon in Guatemala.
