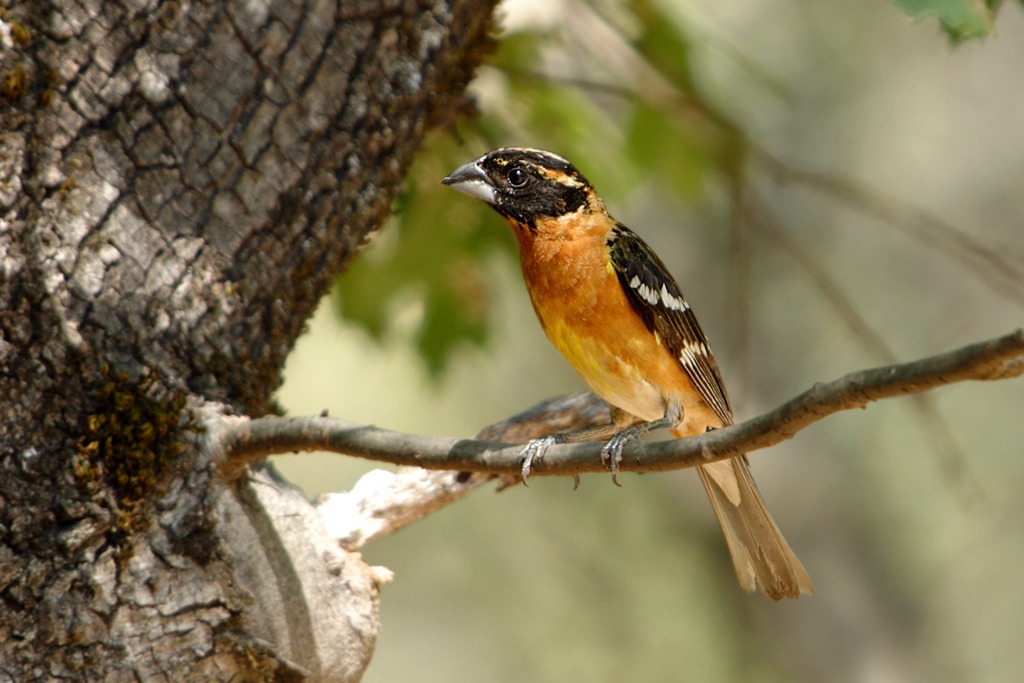
- Male in California, United States

Conservation status
- Least Concern (IUCN 3.1)

Scientific classification
- Kingdom: Animalia
- Phylum: Chordata
- Class: Aves
- Order: Passeriformes
- Family: Cardinalidae
- Genus: Pheucticus
- Species: P. melanocephalus

Binomial name
- Pheucticus melanocephalus (Swainson, 1827)
- Breeding Migration Year-round Nonbreeding

= Black-headed grosbeak =

Species of bird

The black-headed grosbeak (Pheucticus melanocephalus) is a medium-sized, seed-eating bird in the family Cardinalidae. It is sometimes considered conspecific with the rose-breasted grosbeak (P. ludovicianus) with which it hybridizes on the American Great Plains.

The 19 cm (7.5 in) long, 47 g (1.7 oz) black-headed grosbeak is a migratory bird, with nesting grounds from southwestern British Columbia, through the western half of the United States, into central Mexico. It occurs as a vagrant further south in Central America.

== Description ==
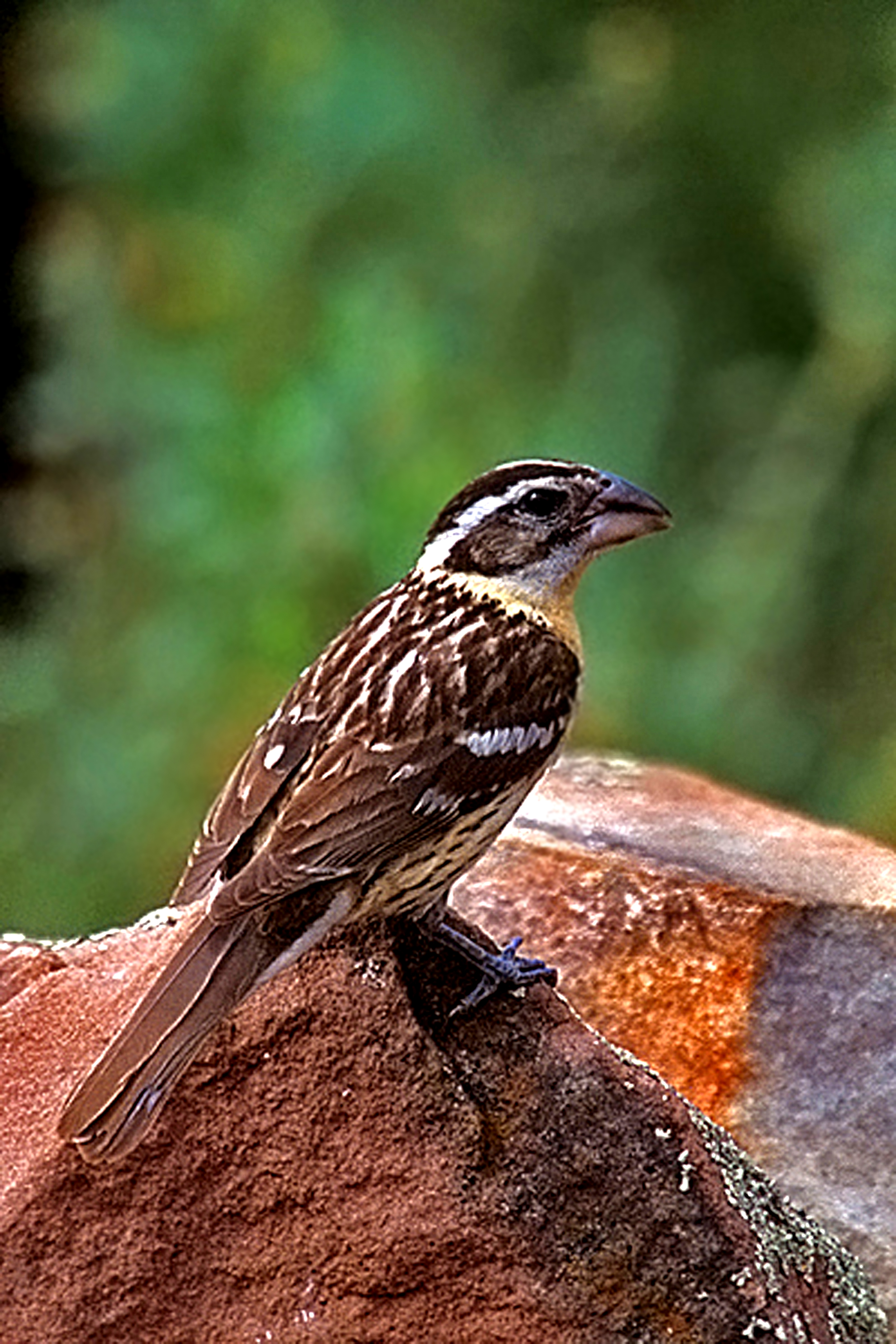
The female of this species looks similar to the female of the rose-breasted grosbeak and is best separated on geographical range.

Measurements:

- Length: 7.1–7.5 in (18–19 cm)
- Weight: 1.2–1.7 oz (34–48 g)
- Wingspan: 12.6 inches (32 cm)

The black-headed grosbeak is similar in size to a common starling. As per its name, the male has a black head, and black wings and tail with prominent white patches. Its breast is dark to tawny orange in color, and its belly is yellow. The female has a brown head, neck, and back with sparrow-like black streaks. She also has white streaks down the middle of her head, over her eyes, and on her cheeks. Her breast is white, and wings and tail are grayish-brown with two white wing bars and yellowish wing edges.

== Habitat ==
The black-headed grosbeak prefers to live in deciduous and mixed wooded areas. It likes to be in areas with large trees and thick bushes, such as patches of broadleaved trees and shrubs within conifer forests, including streamside corridors, river bottoms, lakeshores, wetlands, and suburban areas.

== Nesting ==
Females build nests among the dense foliage on an outer branch of tall broadleaved trees or shrubs, 3–35 ft (0.91–10.67 m) above ground. They occasionally build in dense shrubs such as blackberry. The nest is in the shape of an open saucer, made of fine grass, rootlets, twigs, bark, and conifer needles. It is often lined with rootlets, hair, and fine plant material. The female lays two to five pale green, blue, or gray eggs that are spotted with reddish and dark brown. The eggs are incubated by the male and female for 12–14 days. After the eggs have hatched, the fledglings leave the nest in about 11 or 12 days, but they are unable to fly for another two weeks. The young are fed by both adults. The black-headed grosbeak's monogamy is under study, but pair bonds generally last for only one breeding season. They typically have one brood per season, though two broods have been documented in foothills of the Sacramento Valley in California.

== Voice ==
The grosbeak's song is a rich warble that is similar to that of an American robin, but more fluent, faster, softer, sweeter, and mellow with rising and falling passages that make the song much longer than the robin's. The note is a sharp ik or eek. Both the male and female sing, but have different songs.

== Diet ==
The black-headed grosbeak eats pine and other seeds, berries, insects and spiders, and fruit. During the summer, it mostly eats spiders, snails, and insects. It is one of the few birds, along with the black-backed oriole, that can safely eat the poisonous monarch butterfly. In their wintering grounds, this grosbeak consumes many monarch butterflies, perhaps over one million per year in the overwintering colonies in Mexico. However, only the black-headed grosbeak is physiologically insensitive to the cardiac glycoside heart poisons in the monarchs, which monarch caterpillars sequester from their milkweed host plants and are retained by adults even after metamorphosis, which protects them from most predaceous birds. The same genetic changes that confer resistance to the poisons in the monarch and its relatives were found to have evolved in the black-headed grosbeak in a case of convergent evolution. The cellular target of the heart poisons is the first extracellular loop of the sodium pump, a critical ion pump needed for nerve cells to fire and heart cells to contract. Two of the grosbeak's four copies of the gene encoding this protein have changes that are also found in insects adapted to feeding on plants producing the cardiac glycosides. In one of the copies, it has the same genetic changes at position 111 and 119 as in the common crow and other Euploea butterflies closely related to the monarch, and in another copy, position 111 has the same change as Largus bugs, which feed on dogbane plants that produce cardiac glycosides The mutations at positions 111 and 119 have been shown together, but not alone, to confer resistance to the heart poisons in insects through positive, intramolecular epistasis. In the breeding season, the black-headed grosbeak comes to bird feeders for sunflower and other types of seed, and fruit, and also joins northern orioles at feeders with grape jelly.

== Range and migration ==
Black-headed grosbeaks range from the Pacific Coast to the middle of the US Great Plains and from southwestern Canada to the mountains of Mexico. US and Canadian birds are highly migratory, wintering in Mexico. In the Great Plains, the range of the black-headed grosbeak and the rose-breasted grosbeak overlap and they have interbred somewhat. After the breeding season, they tend to seek out berry-rich areas. They migrate south early in the fall and return to the north late in the spring and have been known to do so in flocks.

== Behavior ==
Black-headed grosbeaks frequently sing from prominent perches. Both the male and female sing, but have different songs, and both are known to sing from the nest while incubating. When trying to court a female, males fly with their wings and tails spread. They forage in the foliage, on the ground, or in low vegetation and are prominent berry eaters. When feeding the chicks sing to their mother, rustling wings and displaying their yellow under-feathers (see image).

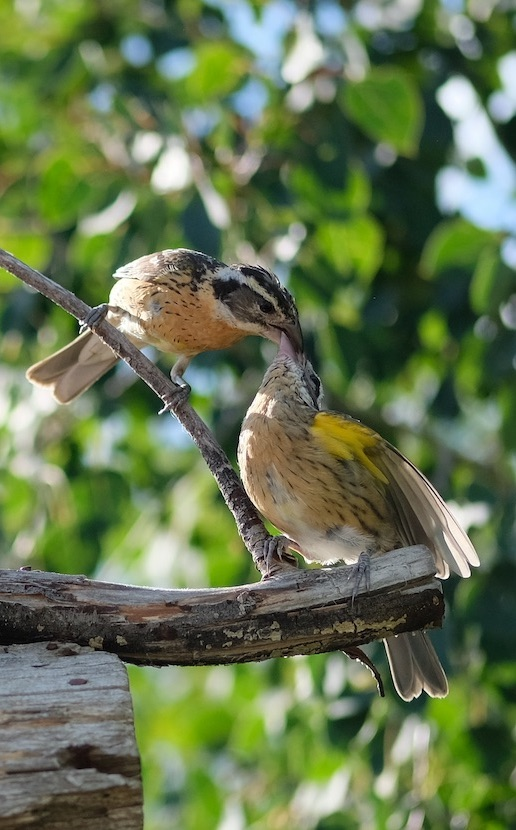
The birdcall is just delightful. The chick sings to its mother, calling for food; seeds she has cracked open and shelled.
