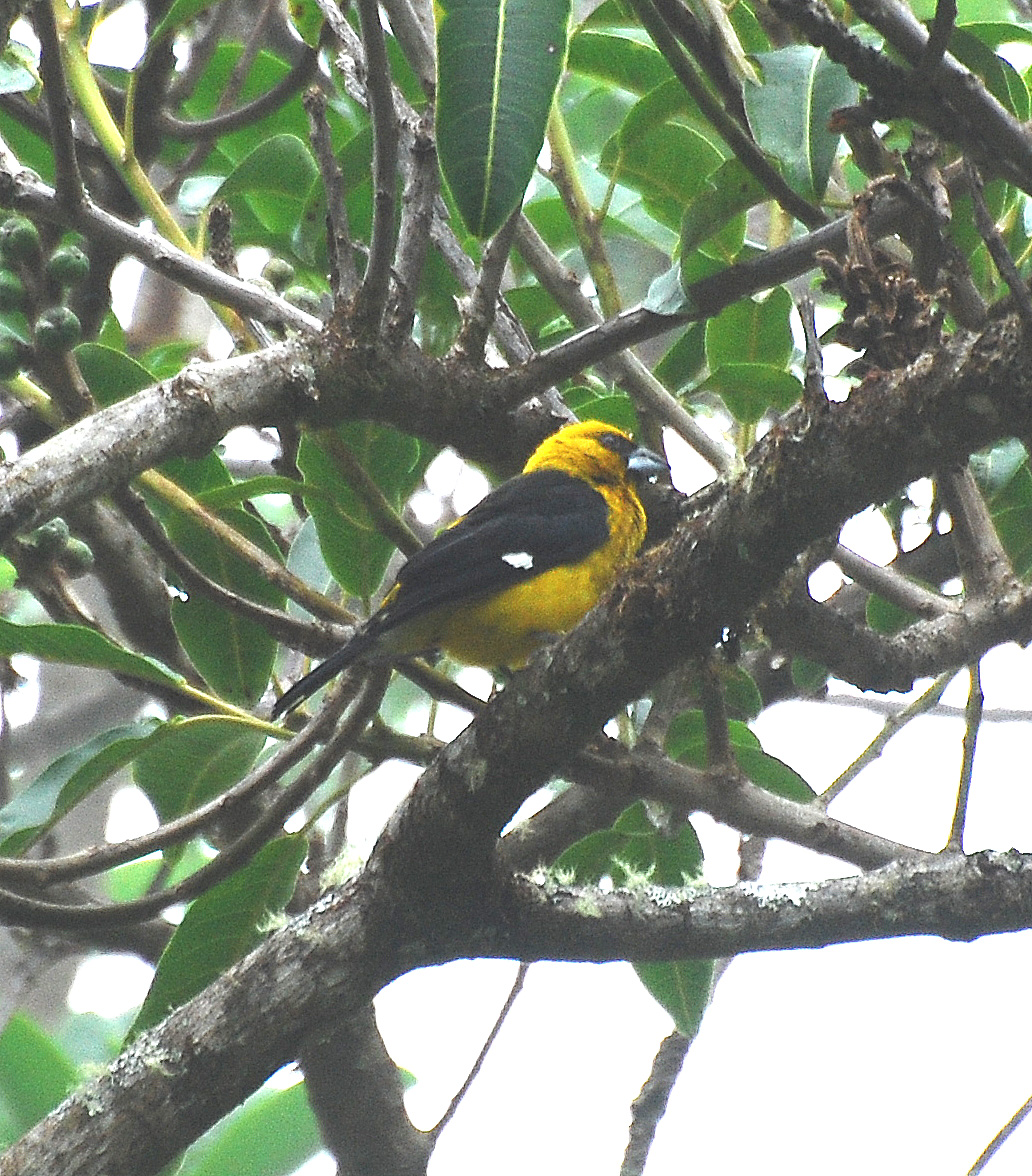

Conservation status
- Least Concern (IUCN 3.1)

Scientific classification
- Kingdom: Animalia
- Phylum: Chordata
- Class: Aves
- Order: Passeriformes
- Family: Cardinalidae
- Genus: Pheucticus
- Species: P. tibialis

Binomial name
- Pheucticus tibialis Lawrence, 1867

= Black-thighed grosbeak =

Species of bird

The black-thighed grosbeak (Pheucticus tibialis) is a bird in the family Cardinalidae, the cardinals, grosbeaks, and “tanager” allies. It is found in Costa Rica and Panama.

== Taxonomy and systematics ==
The black-thighed grosbeak was formally described in 1867 with its current binomial Pheucticus tibialis. Some authors have treated it, the yellow grosbeak (P. chrysopeplus), and the golden grosbeak (P. chrysogaster) as conspecific.

The black-thighed grosbeak is monotypic.

== Description ==
The black-thighed grosbeak is 20 cm (7.9 in) long and weighs an average of about 62 g (2.2 oz). Adult males have a bright yellow head, nape, and upper mantle. Their lores are gray-black and their ear coverts and throat are yellow mottled with black. Their lower mantle is black with yellow edges on the central feathers. Their lower back and rump are bright yellow and their uppertail coverts black with yellow tips. Their wings are mostly black with wide white bases on the primaries that show as a large flash. Their tail is black. Their breast is deep yellow with darker mottling and the rest of their underparts yellow. Their thigh feathers are black. Adult females are duller than males, especially on their head and neck. Their mantle feathers have more yellow and that color extends to the scapulars. They have less white on their primaries. Juveniles are similar to adults but with a more olive head and dark streaks on the rump. Both sexes have a brown iris, a massive bill with a black maxilla and a gray mandible, and lead-gray legs and feet.

== Distribution and habitat ==
The black-thighed grosbeak is found from Volcán Miravalles in northern Costa Rica's Cordillera de Guanacaste south through the Cordillera Central and Cordillera de Talamanca into western Panama as far as Veraguas Province. It inhabits the edges and clearings of forest, pastures with some trees, and gardens. In Costa Rica it ranges in elevation mostly between 1,000 and 2,600 m (3,300 and 8,500 ft) but occasionally "descends to the Caribbean lowlands along mountain bases". In Panama it ranges mostly between 750 and 1,200 m (2,500 and 3,900 ft) but is usually found above 1,800 m (5,900 ft) in Chiriquí Province.

== Behavior ==
=== Movement ===
The black-thighed grosbeak is mostly a year-round resident though some individuals make elevational movements that have no apparent pattern.

=== Feeding ===
The black-thighed grosbeak feeds on seeds, fruits, and invertebrates. It forages mostly in the habitat's upper levels but will feed lower. It takes most food from the tips of branches but sometimes catches insects in mid-air.

=== Breeding ===
The black-thighed grosbeak breeds between March and May in Costa Rica. Its nest is a cup made from rootlets on a base of twigs and moss. It typically is in a small tree or vine tangle between 3 and 9 m (10 and 30 ft) above the ground. The clutch is two eggs that are pale blue with darker spots. Nothing else is known about the species' breeding biology.

=== Vocalization ===
The black-thighed grosbeak's "sweet song rambles up and down the scale with phrases that may end in a rapid trill or an emphatically repeated note". Another description is "a cheerful series of rich, varied leisurely musical whistles and phrases, interspersed with the phrase tweek tseewee, sometimes ending in canary-like trill". Its call is "a sharp pik".

== Status ==
The IUCN has assessed the black-thighed grosbeak as being of Least Concern. It has a large range; its estimated population of at least 50,000 mature individuals is believed to be decreasing. No immediate threats have been identified. It is considered fairly common in Costa Rica and "local or unmcommon" in Panama.
