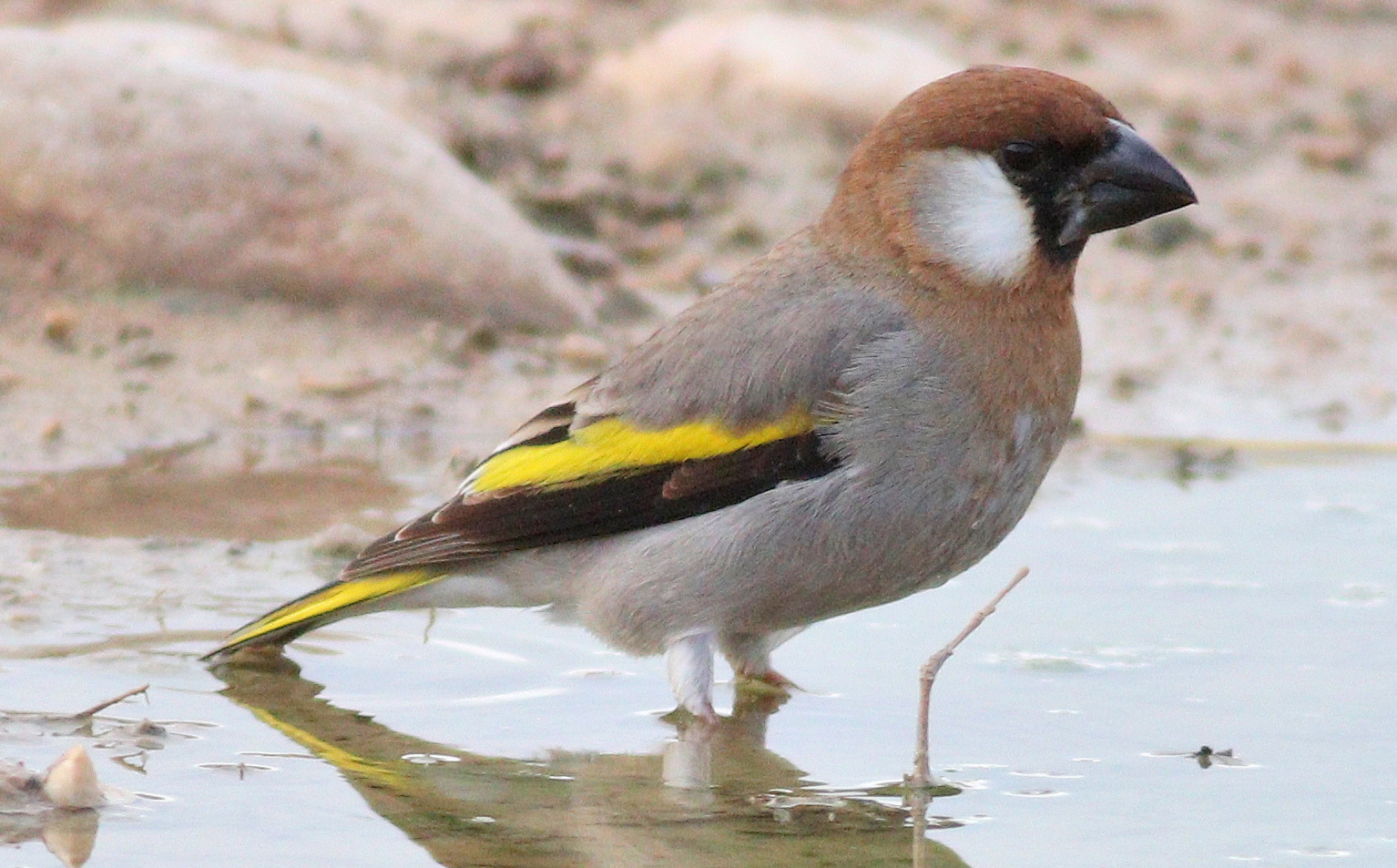

Conservation status
- Near Threatened (IUCN 3.1)

Scientific classification
- Kingdom: Animalia
- Phylum: Chordata
- Class: Aves
- Order: Passeriformes
- Family: Fringillidae
- Subfamily: Carduelinae
- Genus: Rhynchostruthus
- Species: R. percivali

Binomial name
- Rhynchostruthus percivali Ogilvie-Grant, 1900

Synonyms
- Rhynchostruthus socotranus percivali

= Arabian golden-winged grosbeak =

Species of bird

The Arabian golden-winged grosbeak or Arabian grosbeak (Rhynchostruthus percivali) is a finch found in Saudi Arabia, Oman and Yemen. It is included as a subspecies in R. socotranus by some authorities, but in recent times the three golden-winged grosbeak populations are usually considered distinct species.

== Description ==
The males are grey-brown overall with a black bill. The head is brown, with a dark grey mask and white cheeks, and it has large, bright yellow patches on the wings and tail. The females are similar to the males though somewhat duller, and the juveniles are rather streaky and lack the adults' distinctive head pattern.

== Ecology and status ==
The Arabian Golden-winged Grosbeak is typically found between 1,060 and 2,800 metres (3,480 and 9,190 ft) ASL in forested wadis and areas of scrub. Its range encompasses Dhofar in Oman, the Mahra of eastern Yemen, and the mountains of northern Yemen to Saudi Arabia. It ranges as far north as Al Hara near Ta'if, where one or two birds were seen on April 26–27, 1996.

In southwestern Saudi Arabia it is resident in relict East African Juniper (Juniperus procera) forests. In Yemen it has been recorded in spurge (Euphorbia) scrub and woodland of acacias (Acacia) and junipers (Juniperus), while in the wooded Mahrah it is primarily found in Anogeissus/Commiphora woodland. The fruits of juniper, acacia and spurge species appear to form the bulk of its diet.

It appears to be present in low densities throughout its range. The population is estimated at around 9000 individuals, but it is becoming rare due to habitat destruction. Therefore, when it was first evaluated as a distinct species for the 2008 IUCN Red List, it was categorized as a Near Threatened species.

== See also ==
- National symbols of Yemen
