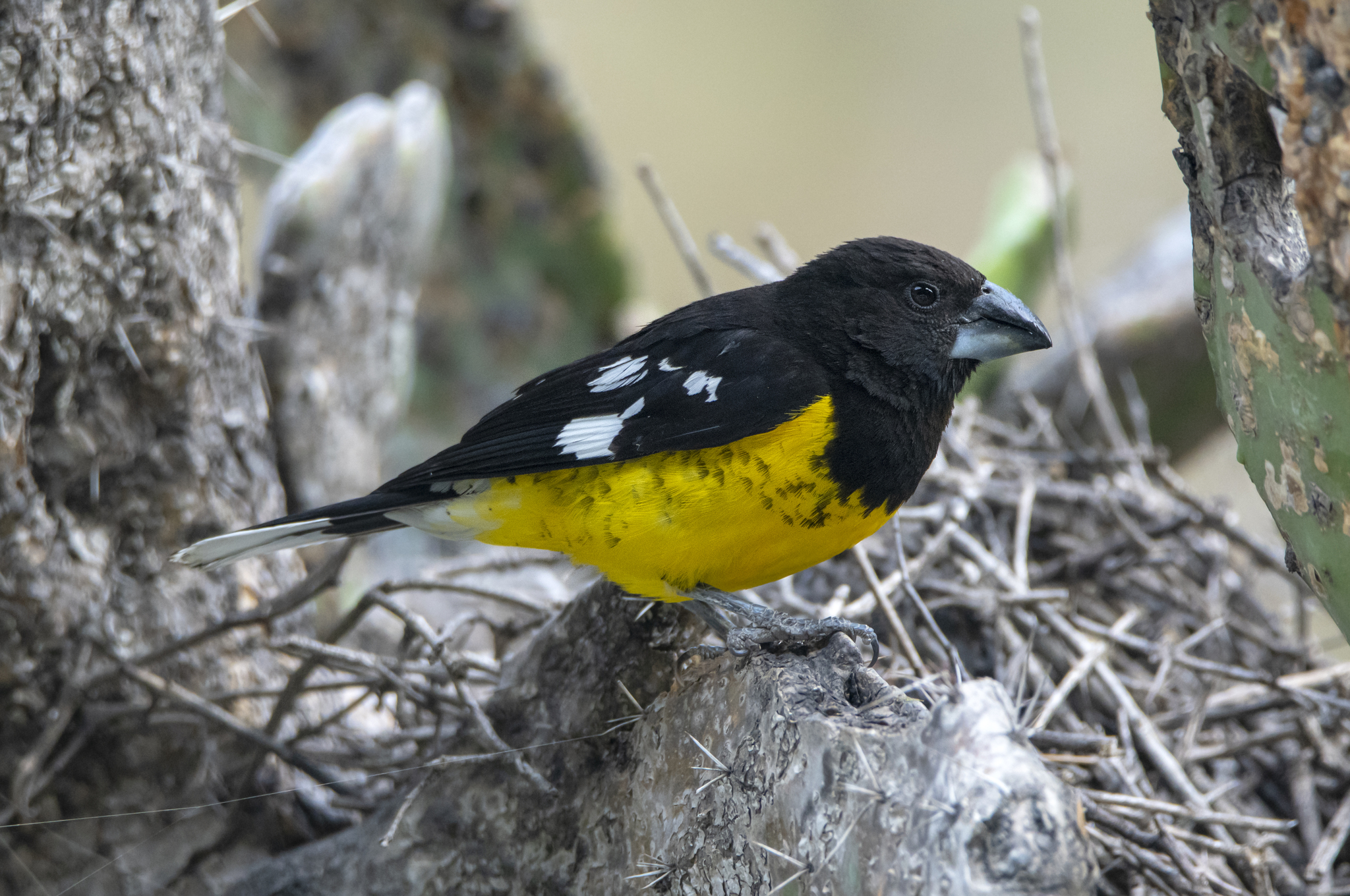

Conservation status
- Least Concern (IUCN 3.1)

Scientific classification
- Kingdom: Animalia
- Phylum: Chordata
- Class: Aves
- Order: Passeriformes
- Family: Cardinalidae
- Genus: Pheucticus
- Species: P. aureoventris

Binomial name
- Pheucticus aureoventris (d'Orbigny & Lafresnaye, 1837)
- Year-round Non-breeding

= Black-backed grosbeak =

Species of bird

The black-backed grosbeak (Pheucticus aureoventris) is a bird in the family Cardinalidae, the cardinals or cardinal grosbeaks. It is found in Argentina, Brazil, Bolivia, Colombia, Ecuador, Paraguay, Peru, and Venezuela. They are often kept as cagebirds.

== Taxonomy and systematics ==
The black-backed grosbeak has five recognized subspecies:

- P. a. meridensis Riley, 1905
- P. a. uropygialis Sclater, PL & Salvin, 1871
- P. a. crissalis Sclater, PL & Salvin, 1877
- P. a. terminalis Chapman, 1919
- P. a. aureoventris (d'Orbigny & Lafresnaye, 1837)

There is some evidence that the black-backed grosbeak may be paraphyletic with respect to golden grosbeak (Pheucticus chrysogaster). Their ranges overlap in Peru.

== Description ==
The black-backed grosbeak is approximately 22 cm (8.7 in) long and weighs 43.8 to 66.2 grams (1.54 to 2.34 oz). All of the subspecies except P. a. crissalis are very similar. The males' upperparts are black with a yellow shoulder patch; the closed wings show white patches. The chin, throat, and upper breast are also black. The lower breast and belly are bright yellow with a variable amount of black flecking on the sides and flanks. The female is similar but browner and has yellow mottling on the upperside and dusky speckles on the underside. P. a. crissalis differs mainly in having a yellow chin, throat, and upper breast where the other subspecies are black.

== Distribution and habitat ==
The black-backed grosbeak is a bird of the eastern Andes. The subspecies are found thus. All except the nominate are believed to be sedentary.

- P. a. meridensis, Mérida state in northwestern Venezuela.
- P. a. uropygialis, the Eastern Andes of Colombia.
- P. a. crissalis, Colombia's Nariño Department south to central Ecuador.
- P. a. terminalis, Peru's departments of Amazonas and Cuzco.
- P. a. aureoventris, breeds in Peru's Puno Province, western and southern Bolivia, and northwestern Argentina. In the austral winter, expands int west-central Brazil and northern Paraguay.

The black-backed grosbeak inhabits dry to very dry woodland (scrubby to open) and is often found in gardens. In Venezuela it generally ranges in elevation from 1,450 to 2,000 m (4,760 to 6,560 ft) and occasionally up to 3,700 m (12,100 ft). In Colombia it is found between 1,700 and 3,000 m (5,600 and 9,800 ft) and in Peru mostly from 1,200 to 3,200 m (3,900 to 10,500 ft). At the southern end of its range in can be found as low as 600 m (2,000 ft).

== Behavior ==
=== Feeding ===
The black-backed grosbeak's diet is berries, seeds, flowers, and insects. It usually forages singly or in pairs, but several may gather in a fruiting tree. It mostly forages high up in trees but can be seen at any level. It does not join mixed-species foraging flocks.

=== Breeding ===
Little information about the black-backed grosbeak's breeding phenology has been published. Evidence or proof of breeding such as adults with enlarged gonads, nests with eggs, and a fledged chick have been noted between November and January. Nests are an open cup made of vine stalks and lined with fine fibers placed up to 3 m (9.8 ft) high in a shrub. The plush-crested jay (Cyanocorax chrysops) is a frequent predator at the nest.

=== Vocalization ===
The black-backed grosbeak's song is "a rich, melodious series of whistled notes". Its call is "a sharp 'keck'".

== Status ==
The IUCN has assessed the black-backed grosbeak as being of Least Concern. It varies from uncommon to common across its range, but is trapped for the cagebird trade.
