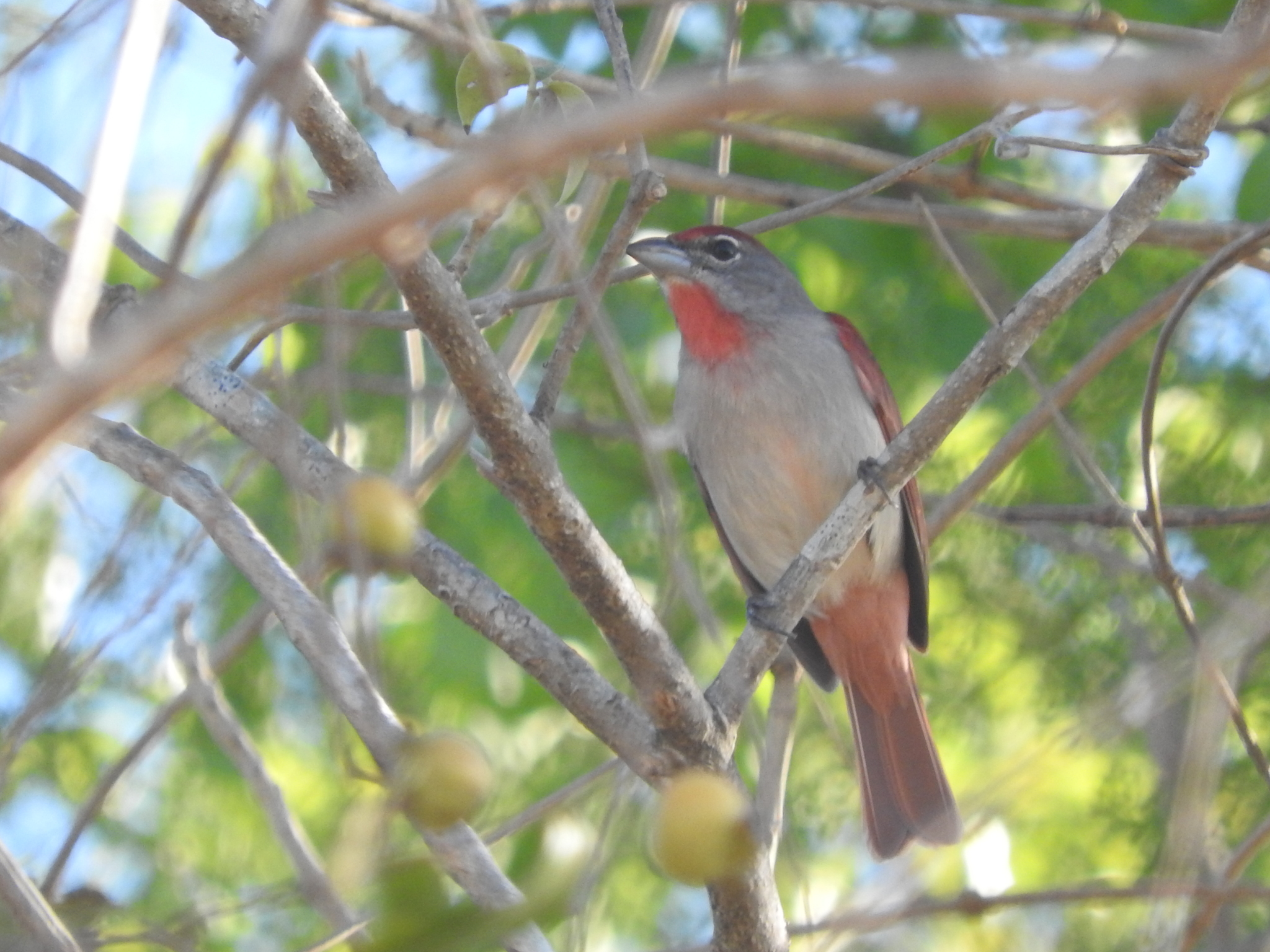

Conservation status
- Least Concern (IUCN 3.1)

Scientific classification
- Kingdom: Animalia
- Phylum: Chordata
- Class: Aves
- Order: Passeriformes
- Family: Cardinalidae
- Genus: Piranga
- Species: P. roseogularis

Binomial name
- Piranga roseogularis Cabot, 1846

= Rose-throated tanager =

Species of bird

The rose-throated tanager (Piranga roseogularis) is a medium-sized songbird in the family Cardinalidae, the cardinals or cardinal grosbeaks. Endemic to the Yucatán Peninsula in Central America, it is found in Belize, Guatemala, and Mexico. The male has greyish plumage with a deep rose throat and crown, while the female is similar but for a yellow crown and throat.

== Taxonomy and systematics ==
American ornithologist Samuel Cabot III described the rose-throated tanager in 1846, having seen a pair in the Yucatán Peninsula and shooting the male. A 2019 genetic study using mitochondrial DNA showed that it was a basal (early offshoot) of a lineage that gave rise to the scarlet, hepatic, summer, western and flame-colored tanagers.

The rose-throated tanager and the other species of genus Piranga were originally placed in the family Thraupidae, the "true" tanagers. Since approximately 2008 they have been placed in their current family, the Cardinalidae.

The rose-throated tanager has three recognized subspecies, the nominate Piranga roseogularis roseogularis, P. r. tincta, and P. r. cozumelae.

== Description ==
The rose-throated tanager is 16 cm (6.3 in) long and weighs 21 to 30 g (0.74 to 1.06 oz). The nominate male's crown and throat are deep rose and the rest of the body shades of gray. The folded wings and tail appear crimson. The female's crown and throat are yellow. The upper parts are yellowish olive and the underparts mostly pale gray to whitish. Its folded wings and tail are yellowish. P. r. tincta has the same color schemes as the nominate but is paler, and P. r. cozumelae is darker.

== Distribution and habitat ==
The nominate rose-throated tanager is found in the northern, drier, part of Mexico's Yucatán Peninsula. P. r. tincta is found in the more humid southern part of the peninsula and in northern Guatemala and Belize. P. r. cozumelae is restricted to the islands of Mujeres and Cozumel off the east coast of the peninsula. The species primarily inhabits the edges of semi-humid and humid mature forest and the undergrowth of scrubby forest, although it sometimes is found in areas with scrub and only scattered trees. In elevation it ranges from sea level to 250 m (820 ft).

== Behavior ==
=== Feeding ===
The rose-throated tanager forages throughout most levels of the forest, in undergrowth, saplings, mid-level, and the canopy. In the last it often joins mixed-species foraging flocks. It has also been observed following army ant swarms. Details of its diet have not been published.

=== Breeding ===
No information on the rose-throated tanager's breeding phenology has been published.

=== Vocalization ===
The rose-throated tanager's song is "a rich warbled 'whee chee cheer-el-chee cheer-el-cheu chee-el-chu...'". Calls include a nasal "rreh" and a mewing "myaaa".

== Status ==
The IUCN has assessed the rose-throated tanager as being of Least Concern. "Although portions of the area within its range are subject to considerable human-caused environmental pressures, the species does not appear to be at any immediate risk."
