= List of birds of the Sierra Madre Oriental =

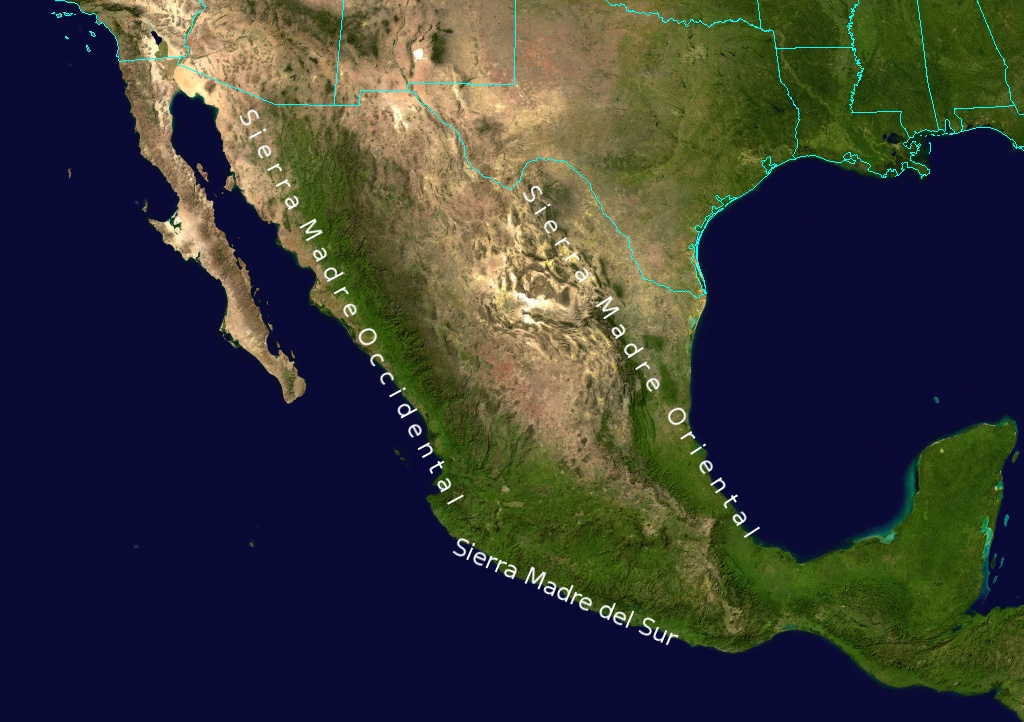
Geographical view of Mexico and its mountain ranges Sierra Madre Oriental, Sierra Madre Occidental and Sierra Madre del Sur.

This is a list of birds whose range includes, at least in part, the Sierra Madre Oriental, a mountain range in northeastern Mexico.

As a twin mountain range to the Sierra Madre Occidental, some species will occur in both; because of the separation by the Mexican Plateau some will occur only in one range. A few species are regionally endemic.

- Bushtit, Psaltriparus minimus
- Great curassow, Crax rubra
- Greenish elaenia, Myiopagis viridicata
- White-bellied emerald, Amazilia candida
- Blue-hooded euphonia, Euphonia elegantissima
- Barred forest-falcon, Micrastur ruficollis
- Boat-billed flycatcher, Megarynchus pitangua
- Cordilleran flycatcher, Empidonax occidentalis
- Hammond's flycatcher, Empidonax hammondii
- Pine flycatcher, Empidonax affinis
- Crested guan, Penelope purpurascens
- Ornate hawk-eagle, Spizaetus ornatus
- Blue-throated hummingbird, Lampornis clemenciae
- Broad-tailed hummingbird, Selasphorus platycercus
- Magnificent hummingbird, Eugenes fulgens
- White-eared hummingbird, Hylocharis leucotis
- Mexican jay, Aphelocoma ultramarina
- Unicolored jay, Aphelocoma unicolor
- Montezuma oropendola, Psarocolius montezuma
- Flammulated owl, Otus flammeolus
- Whiskered screech-owl, Megascops trichopsis
- Maroon-fronted parrot, Rhynchopsitta terrisi
- Western wood pewee, Contopus sordidulus
- Band-tailed pigeon, Patagioenas fasciata
- Painted redstart, Myioborus pictus
- Black-headed saltator, Saltator atriceps
- Slate-coloured solitaire, Myadestes unicolor
- Rufous-crowned sparrow, Aimophila ruficeps
- Vaux's swift, Chaetura vauxi
- White-throated swift, Aeronautes saxatalis
- Flame-colored tanager, Piranga bidentata
- Hepatic tanager, Piranga flava
- Bridled titmouse, Baeolophus wollweberi
- Emerald toucanet, Aulacorhynchus prasinus
- Spotted towhee, Pipilo maculatus
- Gartered trogon, Trogon caligatus
- Hutton's vireo, Vireo huttoni
- Yellow-green vireo, Vireo flavoviridis
- Golden-browed warbler, Basileuterus belli
- Hermit warbler, Dendroica occidentalis
- Hooded warbler, Wilsonia citrina
- Red warbler, Cardellina ruber
- Red-faced warbler, Cardellina rubrifrons
- Spot-crowned woodcreeper, Lepidocolaptes affinis
- Acorn woodpecker, Melanerpes formicivorus
