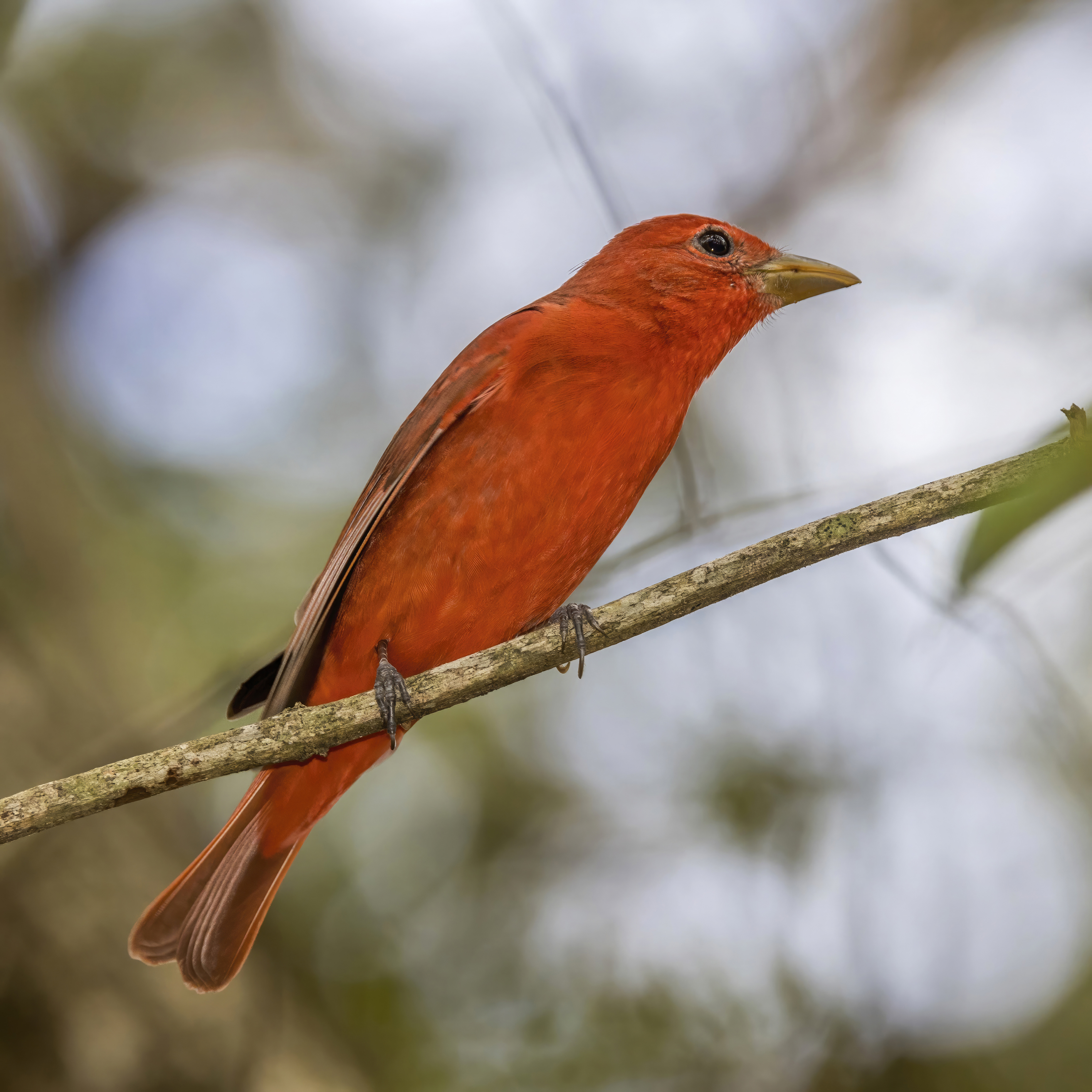
- Male
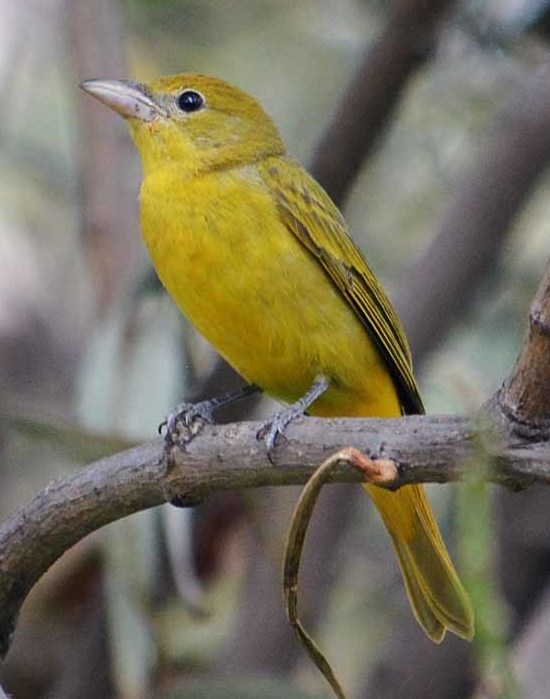
- Female

Conservation status
- Least Concern (IUCN 3.1)

Scientific classification
- Kingdom: Animalia
- Phylum: Chordata
- Class: Aves
- Order: Passeriformes
- Family: Cardinalidae
- Genus: Piranga
- Species: P. rubra

Binomial name
- Piranga rubra (Linnaeus, 1758)
- Range Summer breeding range Winter non-breeding range Migration

Synonyms
- Fringilla rubra Linnaeus, 1758; Tanagra rubra Linnaeus, 1766; Pyranga aestiva Vieillot

= Summer tanager =

Species of bird

The summer tanager (Piranga rubra) is a medium-sized American songbird. Formerly placed in the tanager family (Thraupidae), it and other members of its genus are now classified in the cardinal family (Cardinalidae). The species's plumage and vocalizations are similar to other members of the cardinal family.

== Taxonomy ==
The summer tanager was formally described by the Swedish naturalist Carl Linnaeus in 1758 in the tenth edition of his Systema Naturae under the binomial name Fringilla rubra. Linnaeus based his description on the "summer red-bird" described and illustrated by Mark Catesby in his The Natural History of Carolina, Florida and the Bahama Islands which was published in 1729–1732. Catesby gave the location as Carolina, Linnaeus specified America; the type location is now South Carolina. The summer tanager is the type species of the genus Piranga that was introduced by the French ornithologist Louis Pierre Vieillot in 1808. The genus name Piranga is from Tupi Tijepiranga, the name for an unknown small bird; the specific rubra is from Latin ruber meaning "red".

Two subspecies are recognised:

Image	Subspecies	Range
South Padre Island, Texas	P. r. cooperi Ridgway, 1869	breeds in southwest USA and north Mexico, winters in south Mexico
South Padre Island, Texas	P. r. rubra (Linnaeus, 1758)	breeds in east USA, winters in Central and North South America

== Description ==
Adults have stout, pointed bills and measure 17 cm (6.7 in) in length and weigh a mean 30.1 g (1.06 oz), ranging from 25.8–33.6 g (0.99–1.19 oz). Wingspan ranges from 28 to 30 cm. Adult males are rose red and similar in appearance to the hepatic tanager, although the latter has a dark bill; females are orangish on the underparts and olive on top, with olive-brown wings and tail. As with all other birds, all red and orange colorations are acquired through their diet.

The summer tanager has an American robin-like song, similar enough that novices sometimes mistake this bird for that species. The song consists of melodic units, repeated in a constant stream. The summer tanager's song, however, is much more monotonous than that of T. migratorius, often consisting of as few as three or four distinct units. It is clearer and less nasal than the song of the scarlet tanager. The summer tanager also has a sharp, agitated-sounded call pi-tuk or pik-i-tuk-i-tuk.

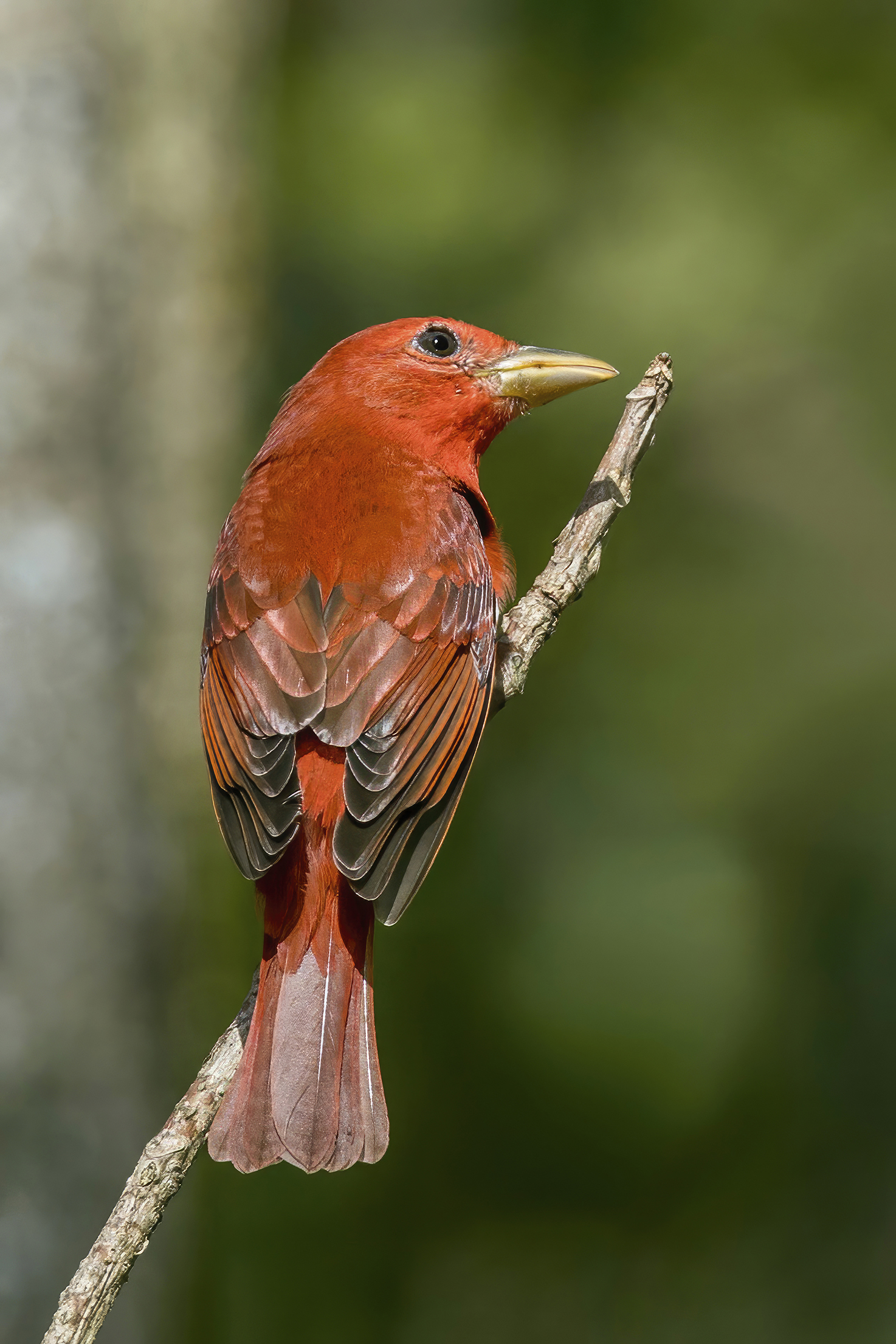
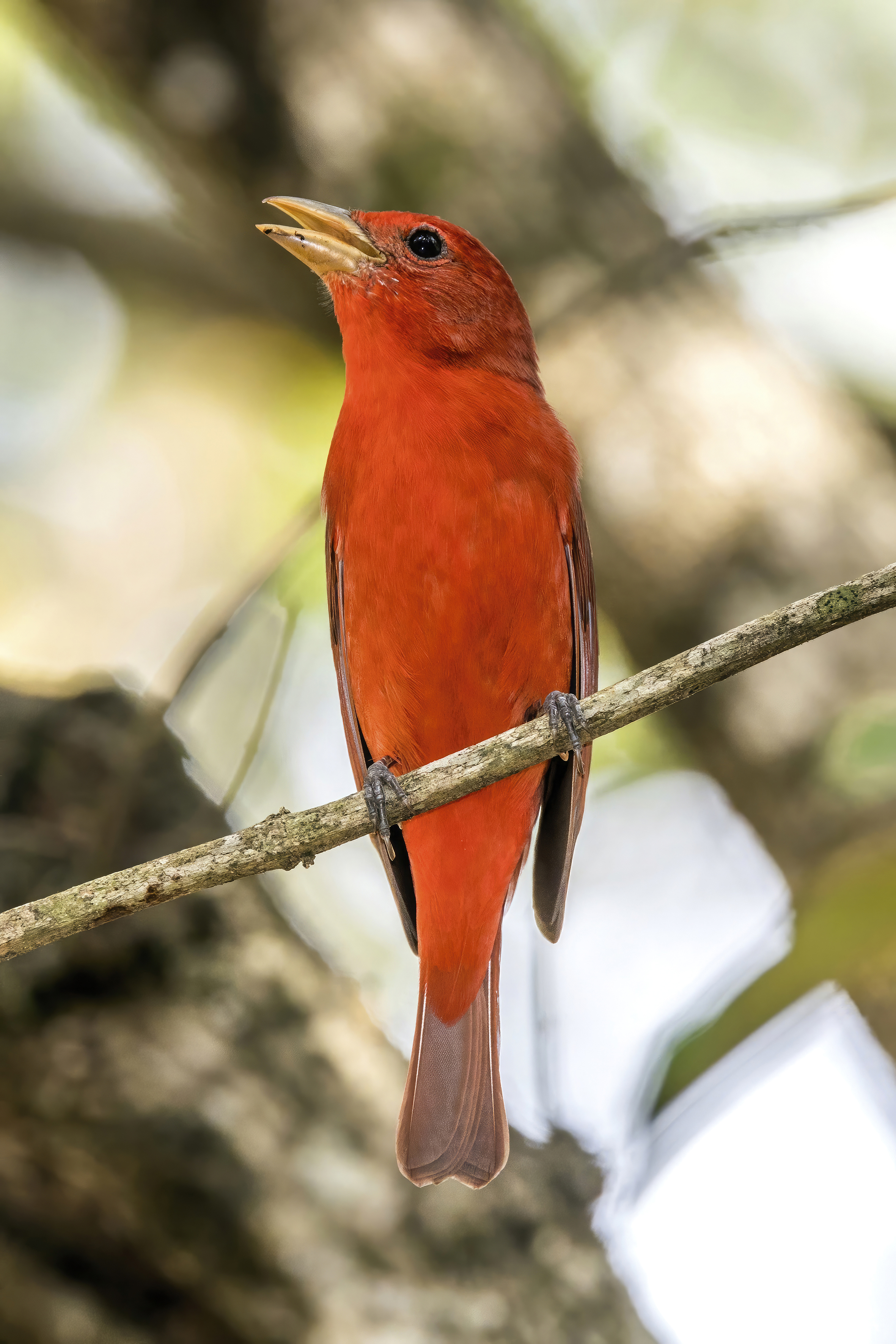
P. r. rubra males, in Copán Ruinas, Honduras

== Distribution and habitat ==
The summer tanager's habitat varies regionally, with pine-oak and mixed forests preferred in the southeastern United States, and riparian lowlands preferred in the southwest. These birds spend the breeding season across the southern United States and Northern Mexico, reaching as far north as Iowa and New Jersey in the east. They overwinter in Mexico, Central America and northern South America. This tanager is an extremely rare vagrant to western Europe.

== Behaviour and ecology ==
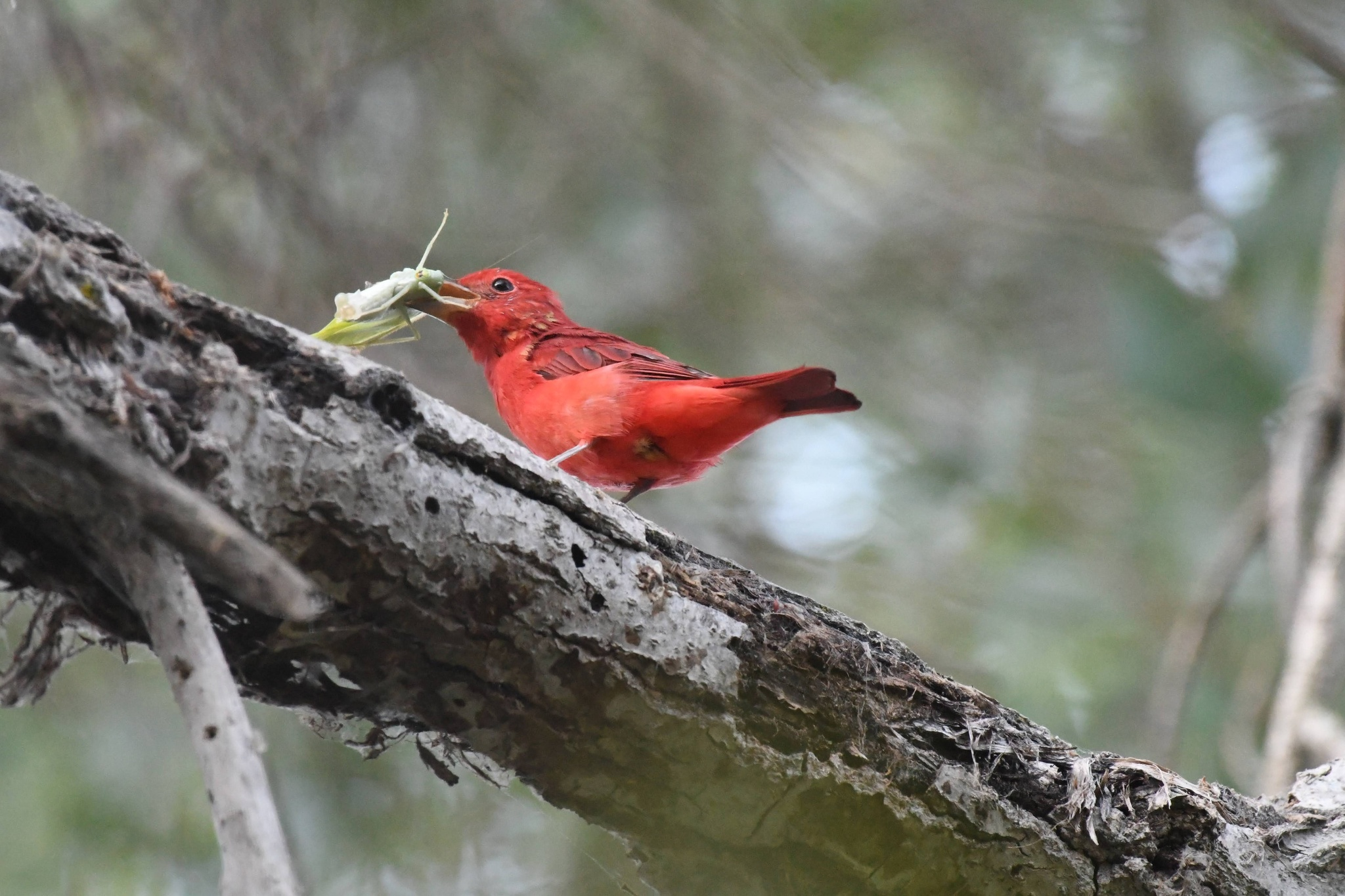
Eating a katydid.

These birds are often out of sight, foraging high in trees, sometimes flying out to catch insects in flight. They mainly eat insects, but also regularly supplement their diets with fruit. Fruit of Cymbopetalum mayanum (Annonaceae) are an especially well-liked food in their winter quarters and birds will forage in human-altered habitat. Consequently, these trees can be planted to entice them to residential areas, and they may well be attracted to bird feeders. Summer tanagers have also been reported to eat larger invertebrate prey, including snails and slugs; there is additionally one report of an individual attempting to eat a vertebrate–a green anole–at a migratory stopover site in Mississippi.

Summer tanagers build a cup nest on a horizontal tree branch anywhere from 4–45 feet from the ground.
