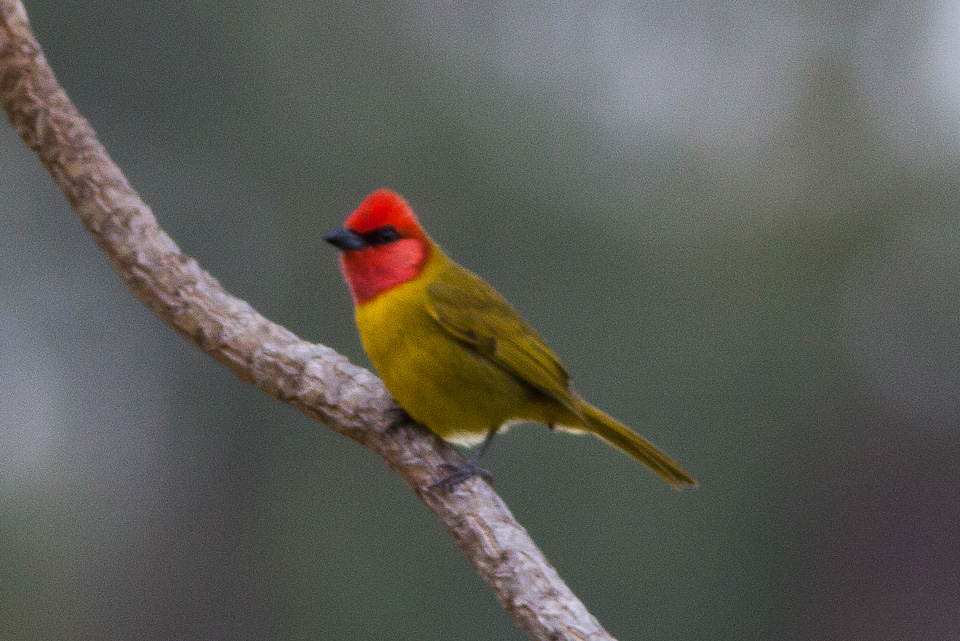

Conservation status
- Least Concern (IUCN 3.1)

Scientific classification
- Domain: Eukaryota
- Kingdom: Animalia
- Phylum: Chordata
- Class: Aves
- Order: Passeriformes
- Family: Cardinalidae
- Genus: Piranga
- Species: P. erythrocephala

Binomial name
- Piranga erythrocephala (Swainson, 1827)

= Red-headed tanager =

Species of bird

The red-headed tanager (Piranga erythrocephala) is a medium-sized American songbird in the family Cardinalidae, the cardinals or cardinal grosbeaks, endemic to Mexico. Comprising two subspecies, it is around 15 cm (5.9 in) long. Males have predominantly yellow-olive plumage with a red head and throat and females have yellow forecrowns.

== Taxonomy and systematics ==
English naturalist William Swainson described the red-headed tanager in 1827 as Spermagra erythrocephala from material collected by William Bullock and his son from a specimen from Temascaltepec in Mexico.

The red-headed tanager and the other species of genus Piranga were originally placed in the family Thraupidae, the "true" tanagers. Since approximately 2008 they have been placed in their current family. It and the white-winged tanager (Piranga leucoptera) have sometimes been placed in genus Spermagra.

The red-headed tanager has two recognized subspecies, the nominate Piranga erythrocephala erythrocephala and P. e. candida.

== Description ==
The red-headed tanager is approximately 15 cm (5.9 in) long and weighs 19.9 to 24.5 g (0.70 to 0.86 oz). The nominate male's forecrown, face, throat and upper chest are red and the rest of the upperparts bright yellow-olive. The rest of the underparts are olive-yellow. It has a narrow black mask. The female's forecrown is yellow and the rest of her upperparts yellow-olive. The throat and chest are yellow that fades to buffy white toward the vent area. The juvenile male looks like a bright female. P. e. candida is similar to the nominate but duller and darker.

== Distribution and habitat ==
The red-headed tanager is endemic to Mexico. The nominate is found discontinuously from Jalisco state south to eastern Oaxaca. P. e. candida is found further north, from southern Sonora and Chihuahua south to Jalisco, and has been recorded further south outside of breeding season. It uses a variety of wooded habitats including semi-humid and moist montane forest, pine-oak forest, evergreen forest, and open woodland with scrub. It can also be found along the edges of forest and in plantations. In elevation it ranges from 900 to 2,600 m (3,000 to 8,500 ft).

== Behavior ==
=== Feeding ===
The red-headed tanager forages in pairs or small groups for insects and small fruit like berries. It favors the mid level of the trees or higher and tends to stay in the foliage though it will sometimes forage at the ends of branches.

=== Breeding ===
The red-headed tanager's nest is a cup of fine twigs placed at middle to upper height in a tree. No other information about its breeding phenology has been published.

=== Vocalization ===
The red-headed tanager's song is "a long, slow ...'chur chew che-wier chéé-chur wee chur cheer chéé-chur ...'" or "tsi-tsi tsee-tsee". It has several calls.

== Status ==
The IUCN has assessed the red-headed tanager as being of Least Concern. It is found in several protected areas and much of its range outside them also has intact habitat. "[It] seems certain that the near-term risk to this species is low."
