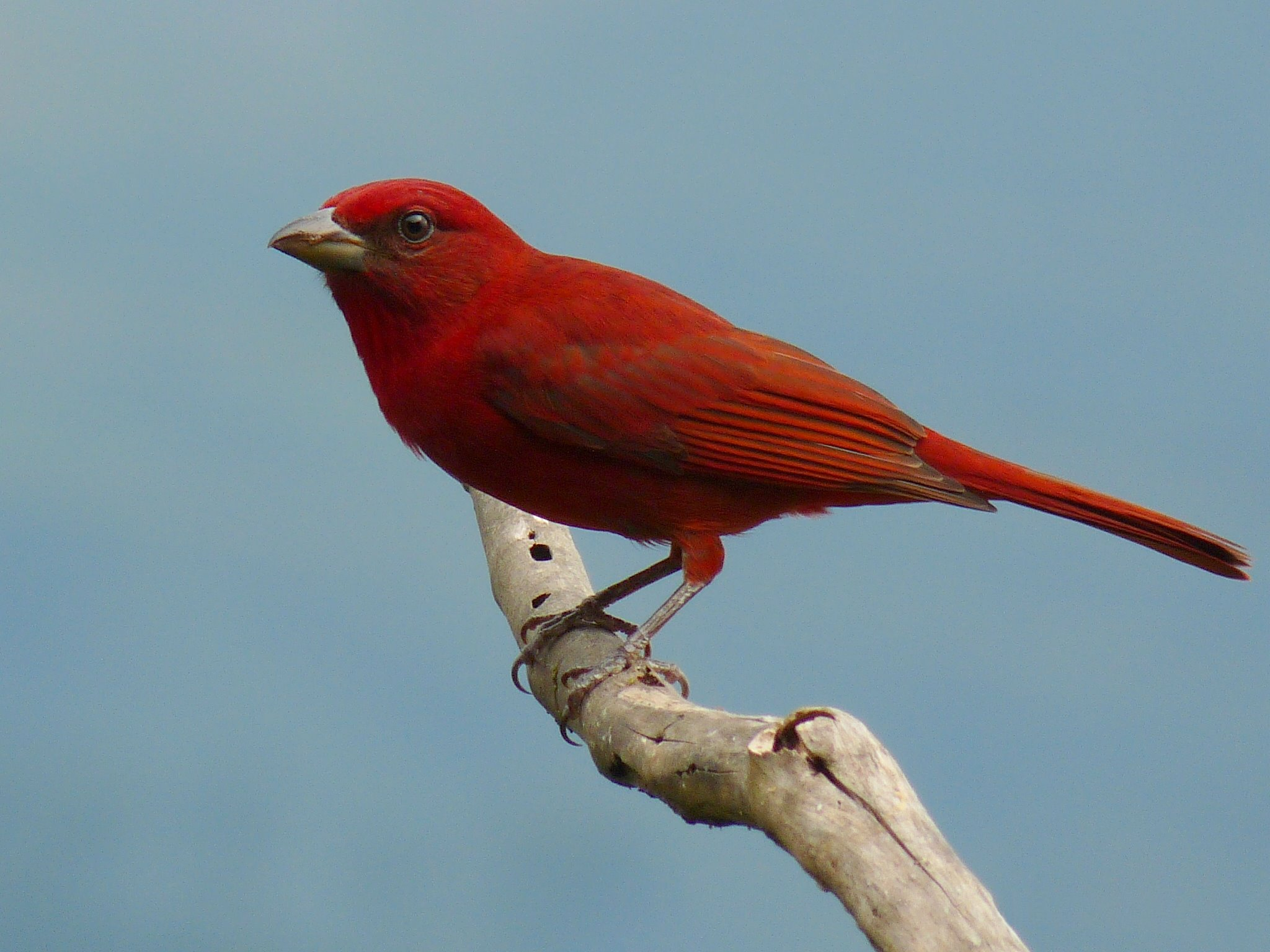

Scientific classification
- Kingdom: Animalia
- Phylum: Chordata
- Class: Aves
- Order: Passeriformes
- Family: Cardinalidae
- Genus: Piranga
- Species: P. lutea

Binomial name
- Piranga lutea (Lesson, 1834)

= Tooth-billed tanager =

Species of bird

The tooth-billed tanager (Piranga lutea) is a medium-sized American songbird in the family Cardinalidae.

== Taxonomy ==
There six subspecies of Piranga lutea:

- Piranga lutea testacea P.L. Sclater & Salvin, 1868 (highlands of northern Costa Rica and eastern Panama)
- Piranga lutea faceta Bangs, 1898 (Santa Marta Mountains in northern Colombia, mountains of northern Venezuela and Trinidad)
- Piranga lutea haemalea Salvin & Godman, 1883 tepuys
- Piranga lutea toddi Parkes, 1969 (mountains of central Colombia)
- Piranga lutea desidiosa Bangs & Noble, 1918 (southwestern Colombia)
- Piranga lutea lutea (Lesson, 1834) (southwestern Colombia and northwestern Bolivia)

The tooth-billed tanager is sometimes treated as part of a more broadly circumscribed hepatic tanager species, where it makes up the lutea subspecies group (highland hepatic tanager). However, the IOC World Bird List splits these birds into three species, also recognising Piranga hepatica (the hepatic tanager) and Piranga flava (the red tanager).
