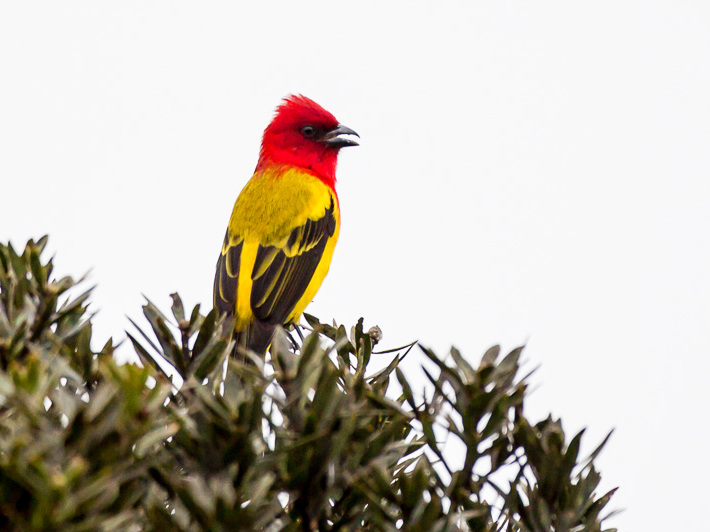

Conservation status
- Least Concern (IUCN 3.1)

Scientific classification
- Kingdom: Animalia
- Phylum: Chordata
- Class: Aves
- Order: Passeriformes
- Family: Cardinalidae
- Genus: Piranga
- Species: P. rubriceps

Binomial name
- Piranga rubriceps Gray, 1844

= Red-hooded tanager =

Species of bird

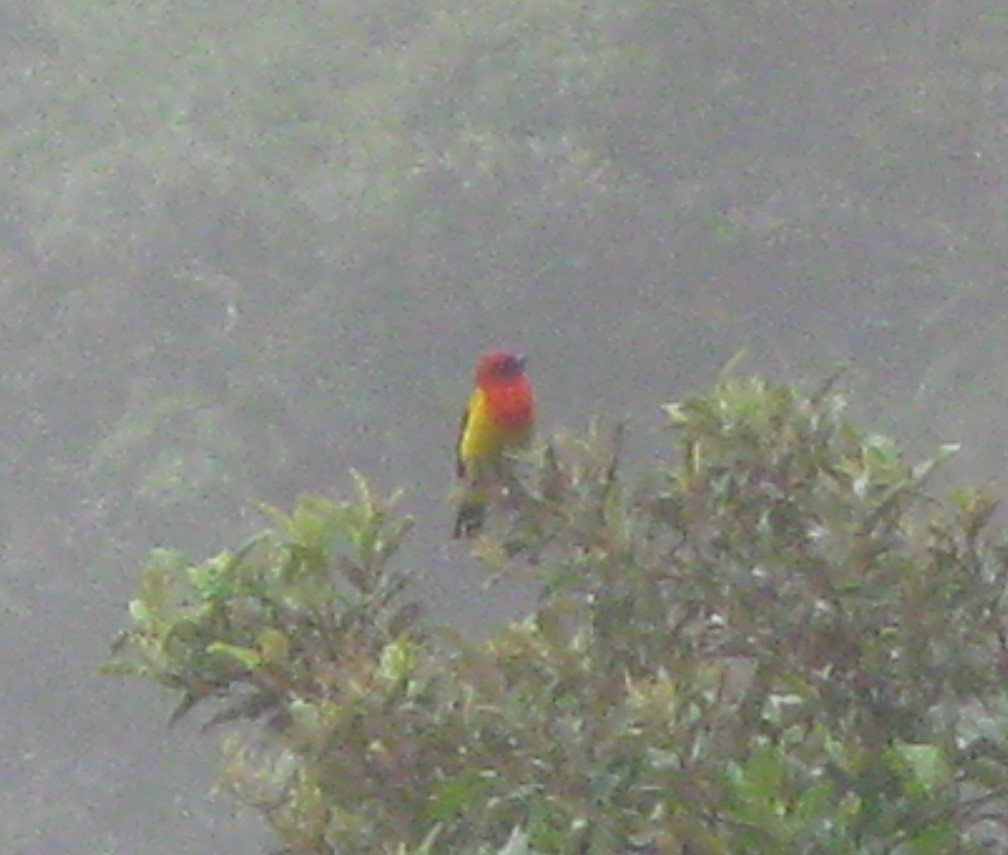
Male red-hooded tanager

The red-hooded tanager (Piranga rubriceps), is a medium-sized American songbird in the family Cardinalidae, the cardinals or cardinal grosbeaks. It is found in Colombia, Ecuador, and Peru.

== Taxonomy and systematics ==
The red-hooded tanager and the other species of genus Piranga were originally placed in the family Thraupidae, the "true" tanagers. Since approximately 2008 they have been placed in their current family.

The red-hooded tanager is monotypic.

== Description ==
The red-hooded tanager is approximately 17 cm (6.7 in) long and weighs 28 to 42 g (0.99 to 1.48 oz). The male is mostly yellowish overall, with a red hood that extends from the head to the breast. The female is similar, but duller overall, and the red of the head does not extend onto the breast.

== Distribution and habitat ==
The red-hooded tanager is found in the Western, Central, and Eastern Andes of Colombia and on the eastern slope of the Andes south through Ecuador to Peru's Huánuco Province. It inhabits the interior and edges of humid montane forest, especially those heavy with mosses and epiphytes. In Colombia it ranges in elevation from 1,700 to 3,000 m (5,600 to 9,800 ft), in Ecuador mostly between 2,200 and 3,000 m (7,200 and 9,800 ft), and in Peru from approximately 1,800 to 3,000 m (5,900 to 9,800 ft).

== Behavior ==
=== Feeding ===
The red-hooded tanager forages by hopping through branches and foliage in the mid- to upper storeys of the forest, often in the open. It travels in pairs or small groups, and about half the time joins mixed-species foraging flocks.

=== Breeding ===
A female red-hooded tanager in breeding condition was noted in Colombia's Western Andes in September. No other information about the species' breeding phenology has been published.

=== Vocalization ===
The red-hooded tanager's song is "a combination of thin trills, e.g., 'tititititi', interspersed with sweeter, more musical phrases such as 'tswe, weéteetseet-see'" . Another song is rendered "tsee-ee-ee-ee" . Its calls include "spink!" and "tink!" notes .
