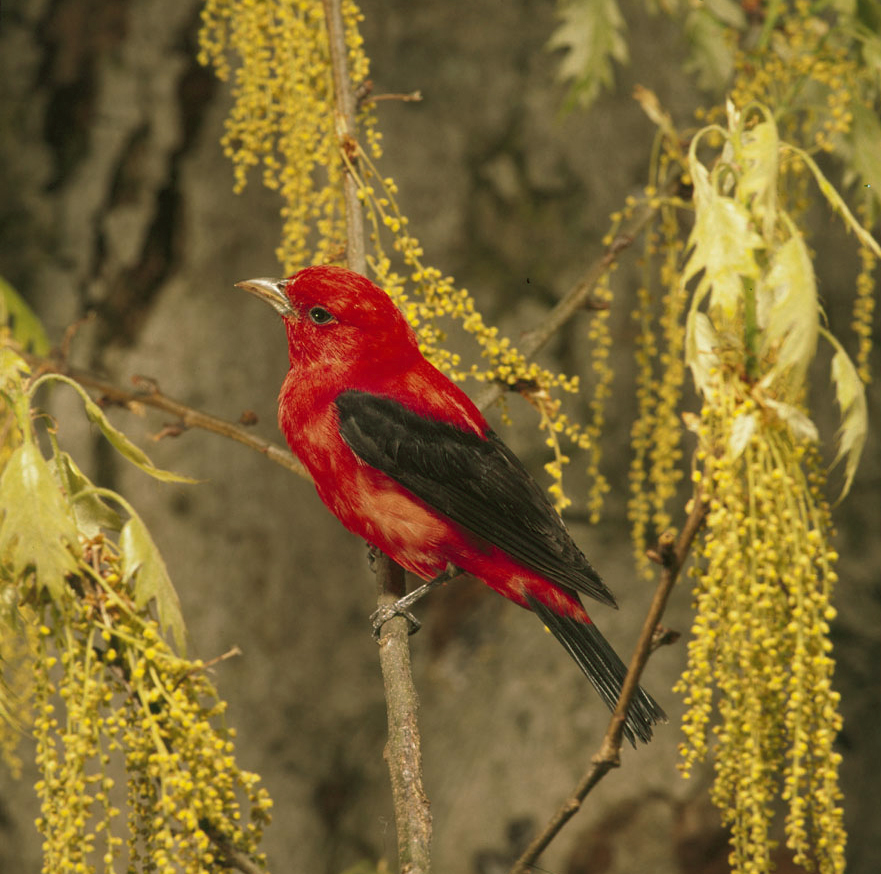
- Scarlet tanager

Scientific classification
- Kingdom: Animalia
- Phylum: Chordata
- Class: Aves
- Order: Passeriformes
- Family: Cardinalidae
- Genus: Piranga; Vieillot, 1808

Type species
- Muscicapa rubra = Fringilla rubra Linnaeus, 1766

Species
- See species list

= Piranga =

Genus of birds

Piranga is a genus of birds long placed in the tanager family, but now considered members of the family Cardinalidae. The genus name Piranga is from Tupi word tijepiranga, the name for an unknown small bird.

Similar in shape and habits to the true tanagers, their coloration betrays their actual relationships. They are essentially red, orange, or yellow all over, except the tail and wings, and in some species also the back. Such extensive lipochrome coloration (except on the belly) is very rare in true tanagers, but is widespread among the Cardinalidae.

These songbirds are found high in tree canopies, and are not very gregarious in their breeding areas. Piranga species pick insects from leaves, or sometimes in flight. They also take some fruit. Several species are migratory, breeding in North America and wintering in the tropics.

== Taxonomy and species list ==
The genus Piranga was introduced by the French ornithologist Louis Pierre Vieillot in 1808 with the summer tanager (Piranga rubra) as the type species. The genus name Piranga is from the Tupi Tijepiranga, the name for an unknown small bird.

Genus Piranga – Vieillot, 1808 – eleven species
Common name	Scientific name and subspecies	Range	Size and ecology	IUCN status and estimated population
Flame-colored tanager Male Female	Piranga bidentata Swainson, 1827 Four subspecies: P. b. bidentata; P. b. flammea; P. b. sanguinolenta; P. b. citrea	Mexico, and throughout Central America to northern Panama	Size: Habitat: Diet:	LC
Red-headed tanager Male	Piranga erythrocephala (Swainson, 1827)	Mexico	Size: Habitat: Diet:	LC
Hepatic tanager Male Female	Piranga hepatica Swainson, 1827 Five subspecies: P. h. hepatica Swainson, 1827; P. h. dextra Bangs, 1907; P. h. figlina Salvin & Godman, 1883; P. h. savannarum T.R. Howell, 1965; P. h. albifacies J.T. Zimmer, 1929	Southwestern United States (Arizona, New Mexico, and locally in southern California and Colorado), Mexico & Central America	Size: Habitat: Diet:	LC
Tooth-billed tanager Male Female	Piranga lutea (Lesson, 1834) Six subspecies: P. l. testacea P.L. Sclater & Salvin, 1868; P. l. faceta Bangs, 1898; P. l. haemalea Salvin & Godman, 1883; P. l. toddi Parkes, 1969; P. l. desidiosa Bangs & Noble, 1918; P. l. lutea (Lesson, 1834)	northwestern South America	Size: Habitat: Diet:	LC
Red tanager Male Female	Piranga flava (Vieillot, 1822) Four subspecies: P. f. macconnelli C. Chubb, 1921; P. f. rosacea Todd, 1922; P. f. saira (von Spix, 1825); P. f. flava (Vieillot, 1822)	eastern South America	Size: Habitat: Diet:	LC
White-winged tanager Male Female	Piranga leucoptera Trudeau, 1839 Four subspecies: P. l. leucoptera; P. l. latifasciata; P. l. venezuelae; P. l. ardens	Belize, Bolivia, Brazil, Colombia, Costa Rica, Ecuador, El Salvador, Guatemala, Guyana, Honduras, Mexico, Nicaragua, Panama, Peru, and Venezuela	Size: Habitat: Diet:	LC
Western tanager Male Female	Piranga ludoviciana (Wilson, 1811)	Southeastern Alaska south to northern Baja California, Mexico. Western tanagers extend east to western Texas and north through central New Mexico, central Colorado, extreme northwest Nebraska, and areas of western South Dakota to southern Northwest Territories, Canada	Size: Habitat: Diet:	LC
Scarlet tanager Male Female	Piranga olivacea (Gmelin, 1789)	Eastern United States. Migrate to Central and northern South America	Size: Habitat: Diet:	LC
Rose-throated tanager Male	Piranga roseogularis Cabot, 1846 Three subspecies: P. r. roseogularis; P. r. tincta; P. r. cozumelae	Belize, Guatemala, and Mexico	Size: Habitat: Diet:	LC
Summer tanager Male Female	Piranga rubra (Linnaeus, 1758) Two subspecies: P. r. cooperi Ridgway, 1869; P. r. rubra (Linnaeus, 1758)	Southern United States, extending as far north as Iowa. These birds migrate to Mexico, Central America and northern South America	Size: Habitat: Diet:	LC
Red-hooded tanager	Piranga rubriceps Gray, 1844	Colombia, Ecuador, and Peru	Size: Habitat: Diet:	LC
