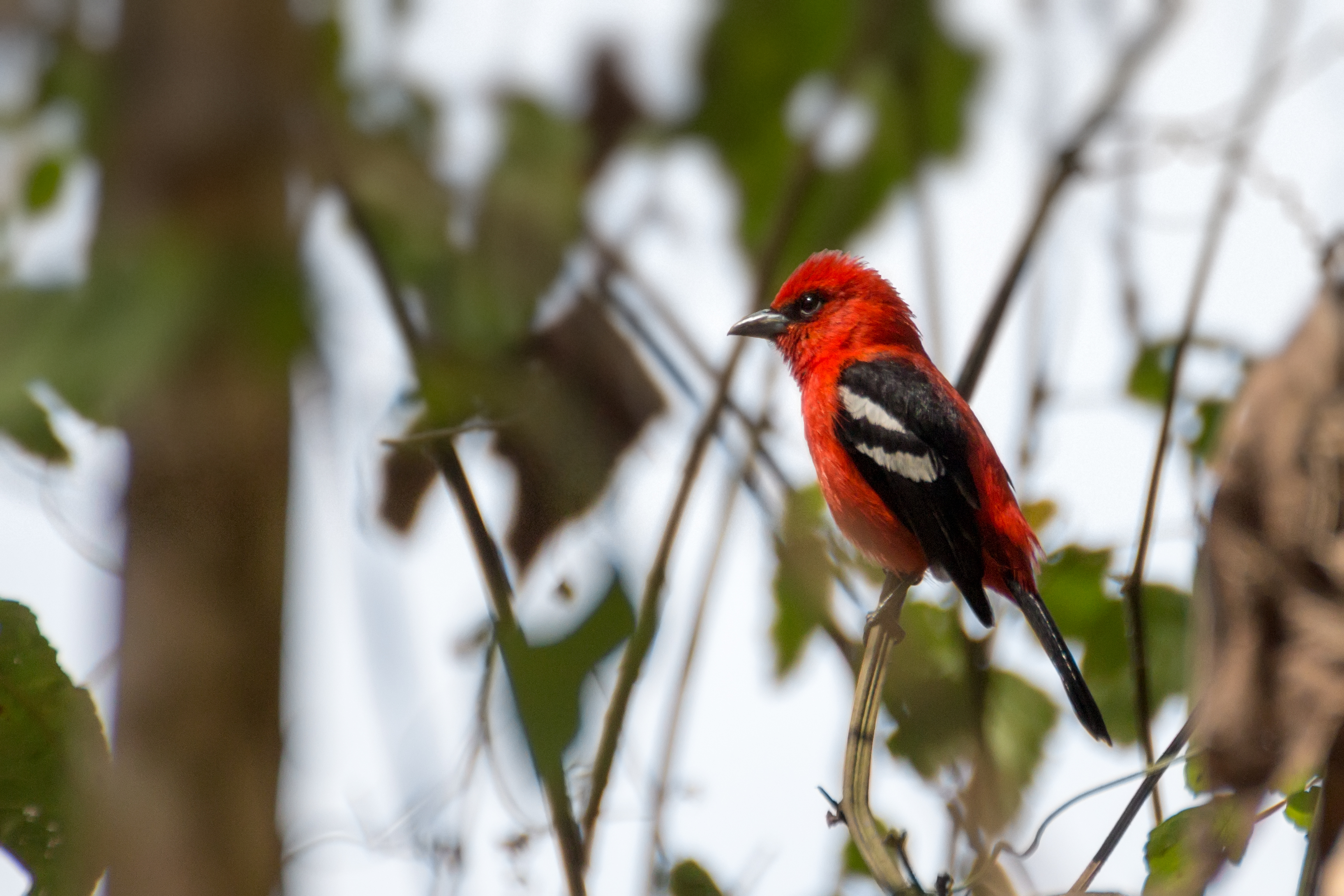
- Male in Venezuela
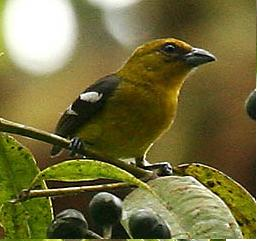
- Female

Conservation status
- Least Concern (IUCN 3.1)

Scientific classification
- Domain: Eukaryota
- Kingdom: Animalia
- Phylum: Chordata
- Class: Aves
- Order: Passeriformes
- Family: Cardinalidae
- Genus: Piranga
- Species: P. leucoptera

Binomial name
- Piranga leucoptera Trudeau, 1839

= White-winged tanager =

Species of bird

The white-winged tanager (Piranga leucoptera) is a medium-sized American songbird in the family Cardinalidae, the cardinals or cardinal grosbeaks. It is found from Mexico, through Central America, across northern South America and as far south as Bolivia.

== Taxonomy and systematics ==
The white-winged tanager and the other species of genus Piranga were originally placed in the family Thraupidae, the "true" tanagers. Since approximately 2008 they have been placed in their current family. It and the red-headed tanager (Piranga erythrocephala) have sometimes been placed in genus Spermagra.

The white-winged tanager has four recognized subspecies, the nominate Piranga leucoptera leucoptera, P. l. latifasciata, P. l. venezuelae, and P. l. ardens.

== Description ==
The white-winged tanager is approximately 13 cm (5.1 in) long and weighs 13 to 20 g (0.46 to 0.71 oz). The nominate male is mostly red, with a black "mask" and black wings with white wing bars. The female is dull olive-yellow, but retains the black wings and white wing bars. The juvenile is similar to the female, but duller. The male P. l. latifasciata is darker red and the female a more intense yellow; both sexes have broader white wing bars. The male P. l. venezuelae differs from the nominate only in having a smaller "mask". P. l. ardens is similar to venezuelae but the lower wing bar is narrower.

== Distribution and habitat ==
The range of white-winged tanager consists of several discontinuous areas. The four subspecies are found thus:

- P. l. leucoptera, from southern Tamaulipas state in Mexico south through Guatemala, Belize, El Salvador and Honduras into north central Nicaragua.
- P. l. latifasciata, Costa Rica and western Panama.
- P. l. venezuelae, the Andes of Colombia (except in Nariño Department) east through Venezuela into Guyana and far northern Brazil.
- P. l. ardens, the west slope of the Andes from Nariño in Colombia south to southwestern Ecuador, and the east slope from Ecuador through Peru to Bolivia's Chuquisaca Department.

In Mexico and northern Central America the white-winged tanager inhabits pine-oak forest and shady coffee plantations. In the rest of its range it is found in humid montane forest, cloud forest, and mature secondary forest. It also can be found in coffee plantations and drier forest. In Mexico it ranges between 100 and 1,800 m (330 and 5,910 ft) of elevation, though it is mostly found above 600 m (2,000 ft) on the Atlantic side. In Costa Rica it is found between 1,100 and 1,850 m (3,610 and 6,070 ft). In Venezuela north of the Orinoco River it ranges from 650 to 2,100 m (2,130 to 6,890 ft) and south of the river from 1,000 to 1,800 m (3,300 to 5,900 ft). It is found between 600 and 2,000 m (2,000 and 6,600 ft) in Colombia, Ecuador, and Peru.

== Behavior ==
=== Feeding ===
The white-winged tanager's diet includes fruit, berries, seeds, and probably insects. Pairs and small groups forage in the forest canopy or edge and may join mixed-species foraging flocks.

=== Breeding ===
A female white-winged tanager was documented building a small cup nest high up on a mossy branch. No other information about the species' breeding phenology has been published.

=== Vocalization ===
Piranga leucoptera - White-winged Tanager(song)

The white-winged tanager's song is "a thin, wiry 'e-seé-se-whéét'" . It has a variety of calls .

== Status ==
The IUCN has assessed the white-winged tanager as being of Least Concern. It is found in many protected areas and much of its range outside them also has intact habitat.
