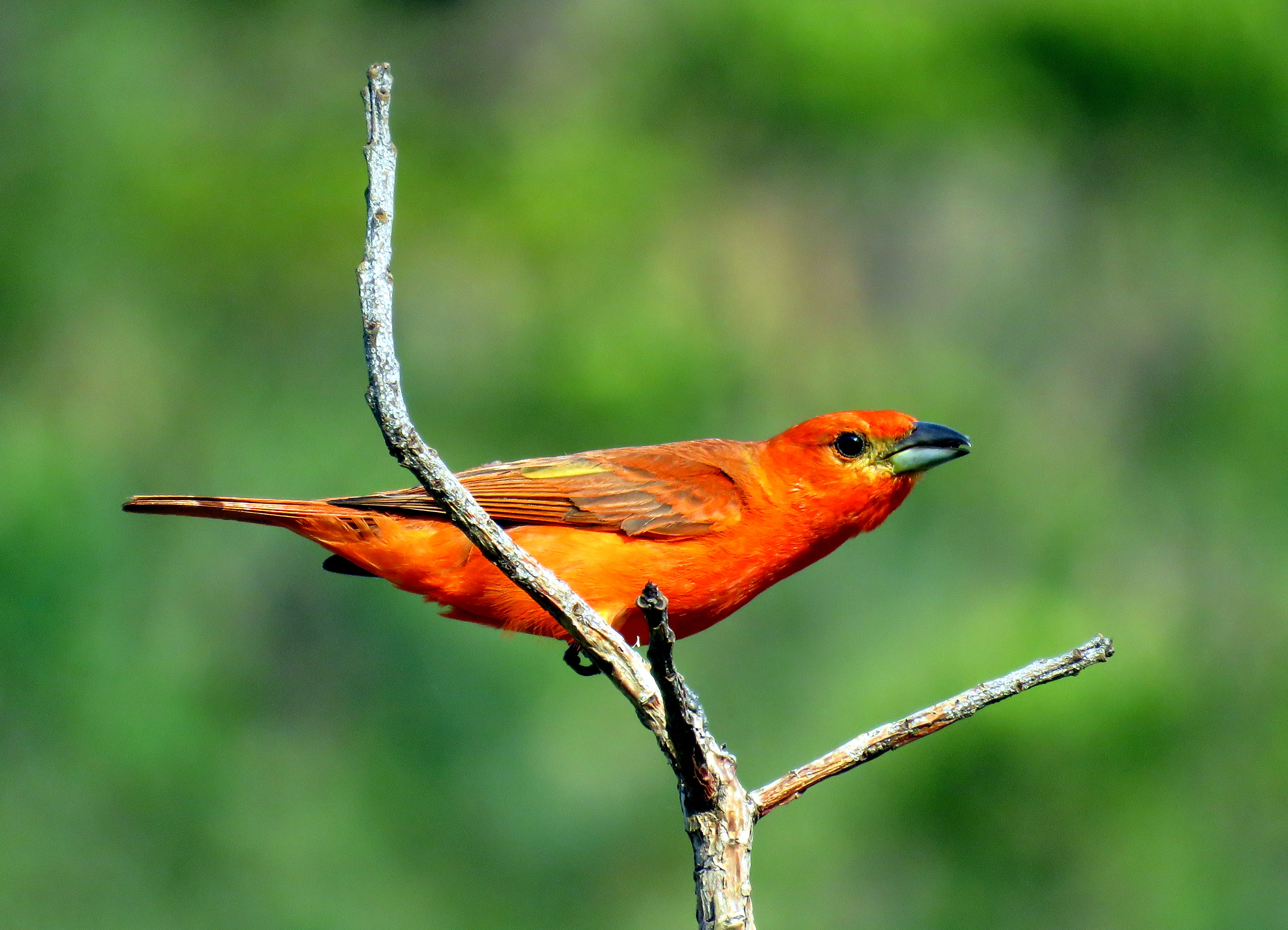
- Male
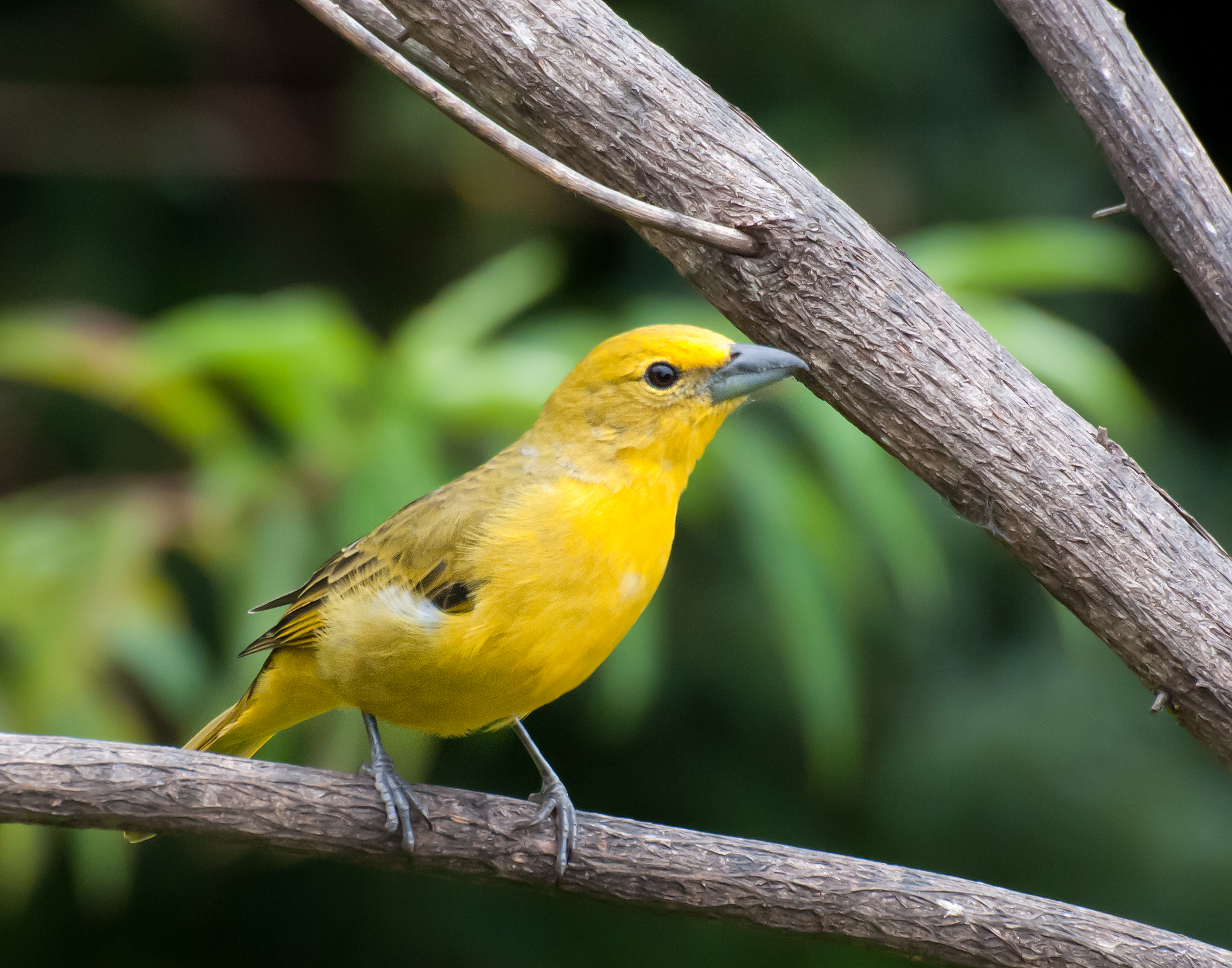
- Female

Conservation status
- Least Concern (IUCN 3.1)

Scientific classification
- Kingdom: Animalia
- Phylum: Chordata
- Class: Aves
- Order: Passeriformes
- Family: Cardinalidae
- Genus: Piranga
- Species: P. flava

Binomial name
- Piranga flava (Vieillot, 1822)

= Red tanager =

Species of bird

The red tanager (Piranga flava) is a medium-sized American songbird in the family Cardinalidae.

== Taxonomy ==
There four subspecies of Piranga flava:

- Piranga flava macconnelli C. Chubb, 1921 (southern Guyana, southern Suriname and northern Brazil)
- Piranga flava rosacea Todd, 1922 (eastern Bolivia)
- Piranga flava saira (von Spix, 1825) (eastern and southern Brazil)
- Piranga flava flava (Vieillot, 1822) (southeastern Bolivia, Paraguay, northern Argentina and Uruguay)

The red tanager is sometimes treated as part of a more broadly circumscribed hepatic tanager species, where it makes up the flava subspecies group (lowland hepatic tanager). However, the IOC World Bird List splits these birds into three species, also recognising Piranga hepatica (the hepatic tanager) and Piranga lutea (the tooth-billed tanager).
