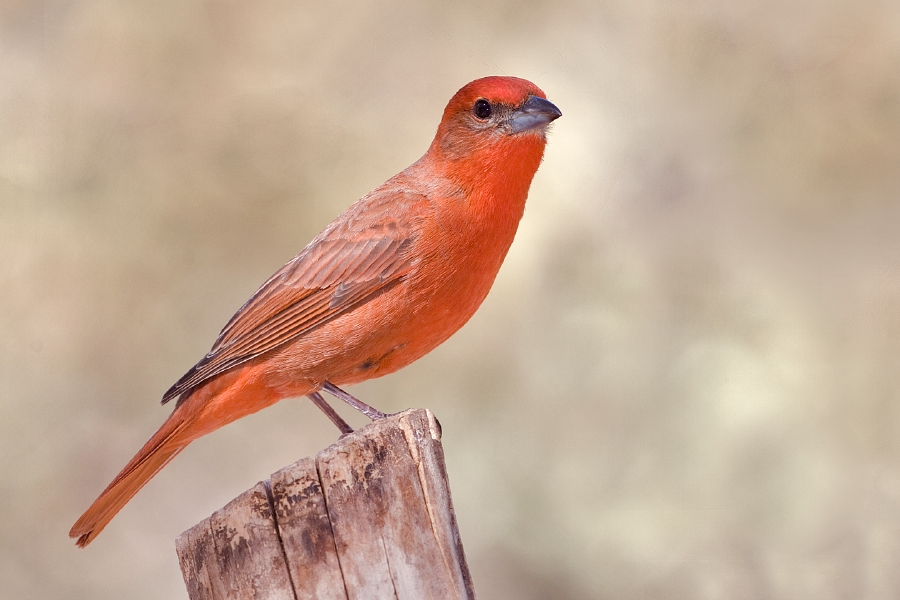
- male in Arizona
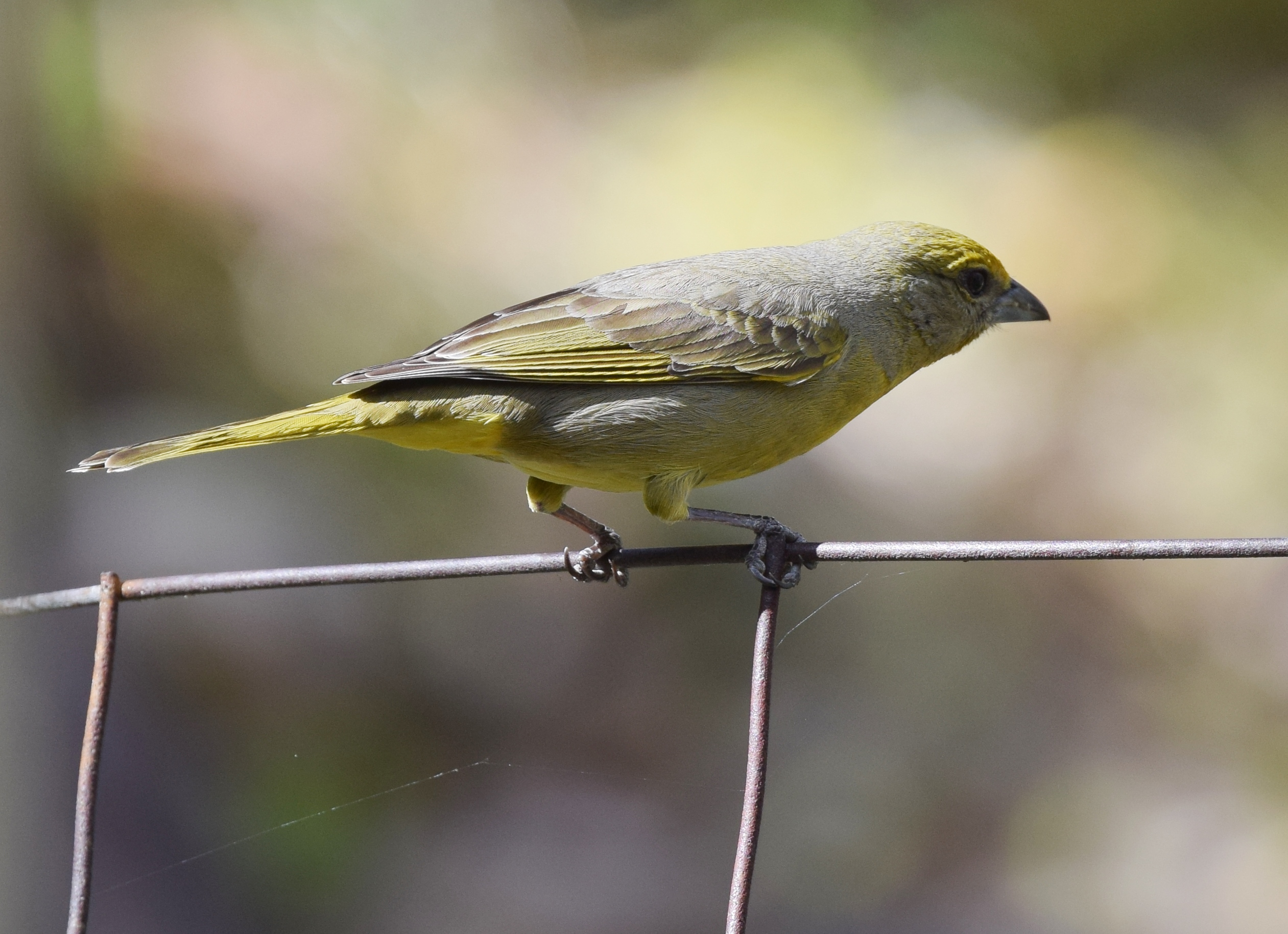
- female

Conservation status
- Least Concern (IUCN 3.1)

Scientific classification
- Kingdom: Animalia
- Phylum: Chordata
- Class: Aves
- Order: Passeriformes
- Family: Cardinalidae
- Genus: Piranga
- Species: P. hepatica

Binomial name
- Piranga hepatica Swainson, 1827
- Passage Year-round Breeding

= Hepatic tanager =

Species of bird

The hepatic tanager (Piranga hepatica) is a medium-sized American songbird. Formerly placed in the tanager family (Thraupidae), it and other members of the genus Piranga are now classified in the cardinal family (Cardinalidae).

== Etymology ==
The common name hepatic means "liver-coloured", namely, brownish-red.

== Taxonomy ==
The IOC World Bird List recognises five subspecies of Piranga hepatica, found in North and Central America.

- Piranga hepatica hepatica Swainson, 1827 (California, Arizona, and New Mexico in the United States and Oaxaca in western Mexico)
- Piranga hepatica dextra Bangs, 1907 (New Mexico and western Texas in the United States, Chiapas in eastern Mexico (to Chiapas), and western Guatemala)
- Piranga hepatica figlina Salvin & Godman, 1883 (eastern Guatemala and Belize
- Piranga hepatica savannarum T.R. Howell, 1965 (eastern Honduras and northeast Nicaragua)
- Piranga hepatica albifacies J.T. Zimmer, 1929 (highlands of eastern Guatemala and Nicaragua)

Other taxonomic authorities don't recognise Piranga hepatica as a distinct species and include it in Piranga flava, a more broadly defined hepatic tanager, with a range from the United States to Argentina. These authorities recognise three subspecies groups, which are recognised as three species by the IOC. According to this taxonomy the three subspecies groups and their subspecies are as follows:

- the hepatica group (northern hepatic tanager), breeding from Nicaragua northwards to the United States, in pine and pine-oak forests and partially migratory. This is the species Piranga hepatica as recognised by the IOC, with the five subspecies listed above.
- the lutea group (highland hepatic tanager), resident from Costa Rica to northern and western South America in highland forest edges. The IOC recognises these subspecies as the species Piranga lutea (the tooth-billed tanager).
  - Piranga hepatica testacea P.L. Sclater & Salvin, 1868 (highlands of northern Costa Rica and eastern Panama)
  - Piranga hepatica faceta Bangs, 1898 (Santa Marta Mountains in northern Colombia, mountains of northern Venezuela and Trinidad)
  - Piranga hepatica haemalea Salvin & Godman, 1883 (Amazonas and Bolívar in southern Venezuela, the Guianas, Serra Imeri in northern Brazil)
  - Piranga hepatica toddi Parkes, 1969 (mountains of central Colombia)
  - Piranga hepatica desidiosa Bangs & Noble, 1918 (southwestern Colombia)
  - Piranga hepatica lutea (Lesson, 1834) (southwestern Colombia and northwestern Bolivia)
- the flava group (lowland hepatic tanager), resident in open woods elsewhere in South America. The IOC recognises these subspecies as the species Piranga flava (the red tanager).
  - Piranga hepatica macconnelli C. Chubb, 1921 (southern Guyana, southern Suriname and northern Brazil)
  - Piranga hepatica rosacea Todd, 1922 (eastern Bolivia)
  - Piranga hepatica saira (von Spix, 1825) (eastern and southern Brazil)
  - Piranga hepatica flava (Vieillot, 1822) (southeastern Bolivia, Paraguay, northern Argentina and Uruguay

The IUCN follows another taxonomy, recognising Piranga hepatica (hepatic tanager) and Piranga flava (red tanager), with the former including the subspecies includes in the hepatica and lutea groups.

== Description ==
The species's plumage and vocalizations are similar to other members of the cardinal family.

The hepatic tanager is a strongly built songbird up to 20 cm long with a short and quite thick beak and long wings and tail. The male is greyish brick-red above, reddish below with greyish ear-coverts. The female is olive yellow above, yellowish below with soot colored ear coverts. Both sexes have dark beaks and dark legs. The song is a three to four second long beautiful and thrush-like series, but also reminiscent of a black-capped cardinal. The most common sound is rendered in English literature as a clipped "tchup", while in flight it sometimes emits a soft, scream-like "wenk".

== Habitat ==
Hepatic tanager is found in open mountain forests with pine or pine and oak. There it is seen jumping slowly upwards in trees and bushes in search of food, but can also catch flying insects by lunging. It is often found in pairs or small groups, probably families. The nest is placed in a cleft far out on a branch, about 15 to 30 meters above the ground. There she lays three to five eggs.

== Behavior ==
The habits of the hepatic tanager are similar to those of the western tanager.

Its call is a low, dry chup like the hermit thrush. Its song is clearer than Thraupidae tanagers and far more similar to the song of the black-headed grosbeak, another member of the Cardinalidae. The flight call is a husky and rising weet.

== Feeding ==
It looks for food in the foliage of trees, moving slowly and methodically; different individuals use different strategies. In summer, the northern form largely eats insects, spiders and some fruit. In Mexico, it has been observed to eat nectar. From Oaxaca south, it follows swarms of army ants.
