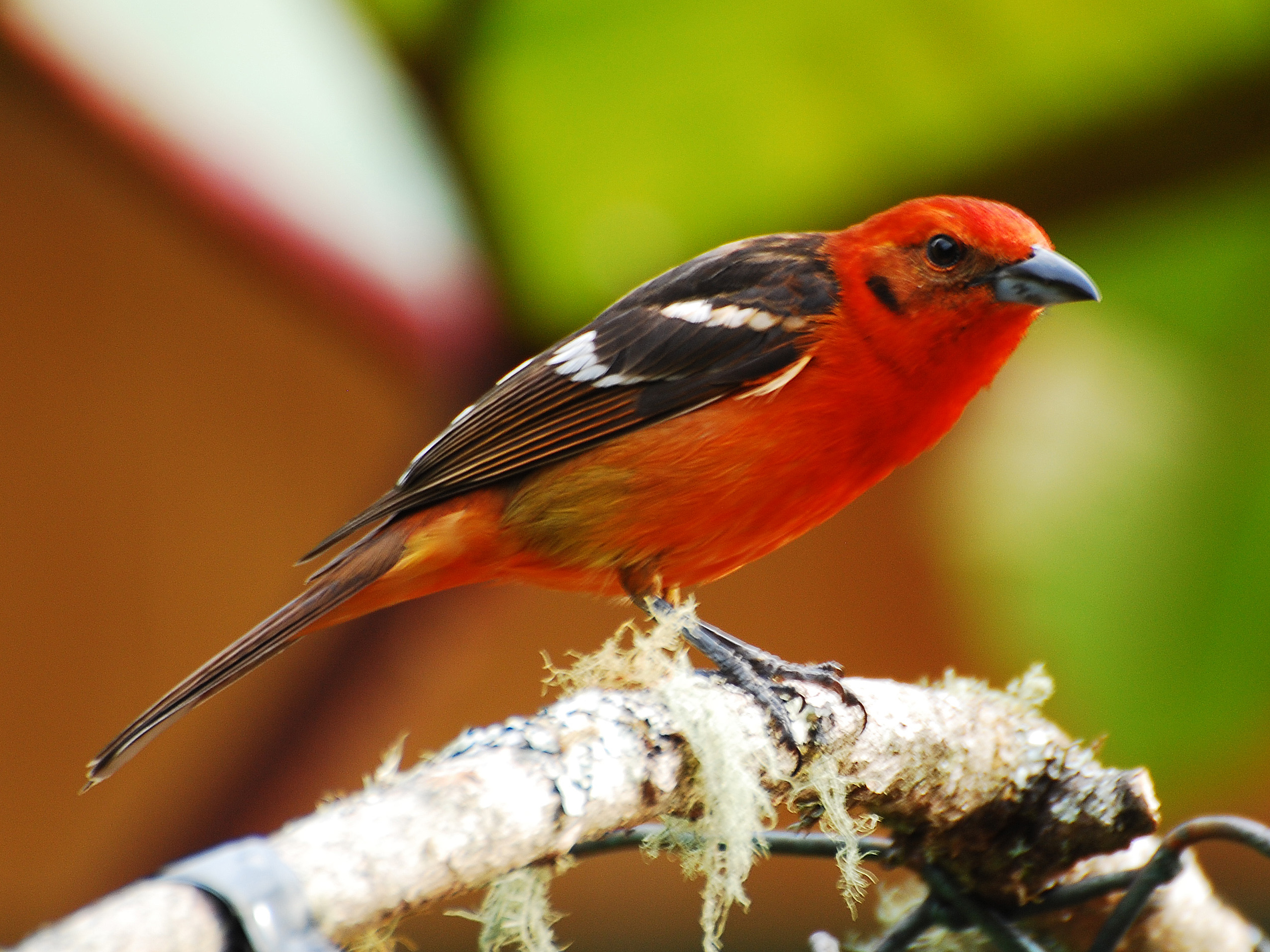
- Male
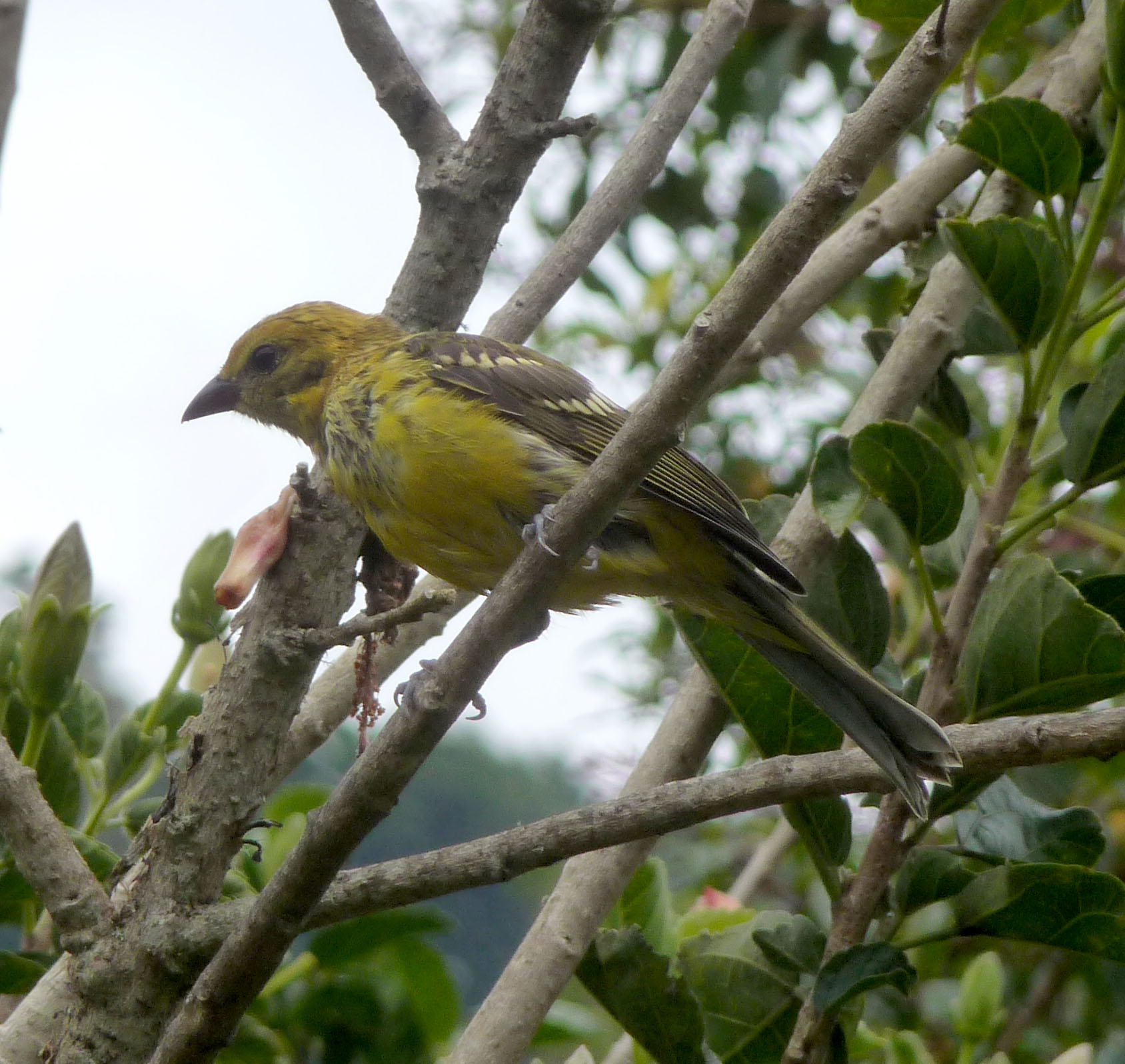
- Female

Conservation status
- Least Concern (IUCN 3.1)

Scientific classification
- Kingdom: Animalia
- Phylum: Chordata
- Class: Aves
- Order: Passeriformes
- Family: Cardinalidae
- Genus: Piranga
- Species: P. bidentata

Binomial name
- Piranga bidentata Swainson, 1827

= Flame-colored tanager =

Species of bird

The flame-colored tanager (Piranga bidentata), formerly known as the stripe-backed tanager, is a medium-sized American songbird in the family Cardinalidae, the cardinals or cardinal grosbeaks. It is found from Mexico throughout Central America to northern Panama and occasionally in the United States; four subspecies are recognized. The flame-colored tanager is 18 to 19 cm (7.1 to 7.5 in) long, the male having predominantly red-orange while the female is more yellowish orange.

== Taxonomy and systematics ==
English naturalist William Swainson described the flame-colored tanager in 1827 from material collected by William Bullock and his son from a specimen from Temascaltepec in Mexico. French ornithologist Frédéric de Lafresnaye described Piranga sanguinolenta as a separate species in 1839, though the two were generally regarded as conspecific by the end of the 19th century.

A 2019 genetic study using mitochondrial DNA showed that the flame-colored tanager was the sister taxon of the western tanager (P. ludoviciana).

The flame-colored tanager and the other species of genus Piranga were originally placed in the family Thraupidae, the "true" tanagers. Since approximately 2008 they have been placed in their current family.

The flame-colored tanager has four recognized subspecies, the nominate Piranga bidentata bidentata, P. b. flammea, P. b. sanguinolenta, and P. b. citrea.

== Description ==
The flame-colored tanager is 18 to 19 cm (7.1 to 7.5 in) long. The nominate weighs 33.3 to 39.4 g (1.17 to 1.39 oz) and P. b. flammea 32 to 48.4 g (1.13 to 1.71 oz). The nominate male's head and underparts are red-orange becoming yellower towards the vent area. It has a brown patch below the eye from the bill to behind the eye. The mantle and back are dusky orange with an olive tint; the rump is paler with little or no streaking. The female has a similar pattern but its head and underparts are yellow and the back is olive with black streaks. The male P. b. flammea is a paler red-orange than the nominate. P. b. sanguinolenta is also similar to the nominate but the head and underparts are bright red to orange-red. P. b. citrea is paler and more orange below compared to the nominate.

== Distribution and habitat ==
The subspecies of flame-colored tanager are found thus:

- P. b. bidentata, principally from western Mexico's Sonora and Chihuahua states south to Guerrero and east to near Mexico City. It occasionally reaches southern Arizona and less frequently western Texas.
- P. b. flammea, Mexico's Nayarit state and Islas Marías
- P. b. sanguinolenta, from eastern Mexico's Nuevo León and Tamaulipas states south through Guatemala, Honduras, and El Salvador into north central Nicaragua
- P. b. citrea, Costa Rica and western Panama

The flame-colored tanager inhabits the canopy of humid montane forest and large trees in non-forested areas such as pastures, coffee plantations, and gardens. In much of its range it is also found in open oak and pine-oak woodlands. It is generally a bird of the mountains but can be found near sea level in Guatemala. In Mexico it ranges from 800 m (2,600 ft) to treeline and in Panama lives at 1,200 m (3,900 ft) and higher. On the Caribbean slope in Costa Rica it ranges from 1,850 to 2,850 m (6,070 to 9,350 ft) and on the Pacific slope can be found as low as 900 m (3,000 ft). It is largely resident but may seek lower elevations in winter. Those found in the United States are pre- and post-breeding wanderers and rarely nesters, with several sightings and one specimen collected in Texas. Bird watchers view and recorded a flame colored tanager in south east Wisconsin April 2023.USA Today Network-WIS.

== Behavior ==
=== Feeding ===
The flame-colored tanager's diet is small arthropods and a variety of berries. It usually forages alone or in pairs, but will join mixed-species foraging flocks. Though it usually hunts through the tops of trees, it also sallies out for flying insects and sometimes descends to near the ground to glean fruit. It has been reported ambushing swarms of army ants (Eciton burchellii) carrying wasp larvae and pupae, and eating both ant and wasp. The predatory status of this bird has been documented to prey on certain types of arthropods found within the Sonoran canopy as it dives to catch insects and often those being carried by army ants.

=== Breeding ===
The flame-colored tanager's nest is an open cup of fairly coarse material lined with fine grass; it can be placed in dense foliage or in isolated trees or shrubs in a more open area. Breeding has been documented in April and May.

=== Vocalization ===
The flame-colored tanager's song is similar to a vireo's, a "rich, musical ... 'chewee-very-vire, chewee-very-vire-very, cheery-cheweea ...'". Its call is "per-dick" or "chi-dick".

== Status ==
The IUCN has assessed the flame-colored tanager as being of Least Concern. The species occurs in several protected areas, and is "less sensitive to environmental disturbance than are many species."
