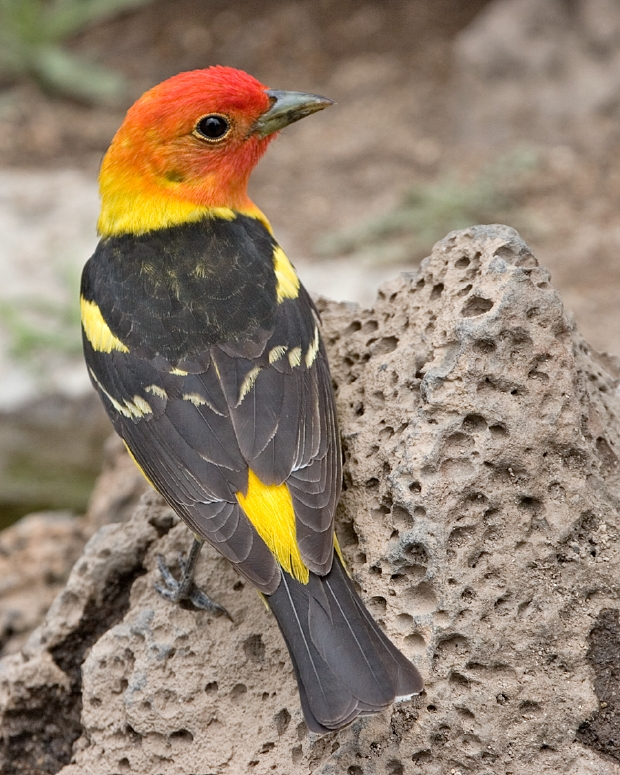
- Adult male in breeding plumage
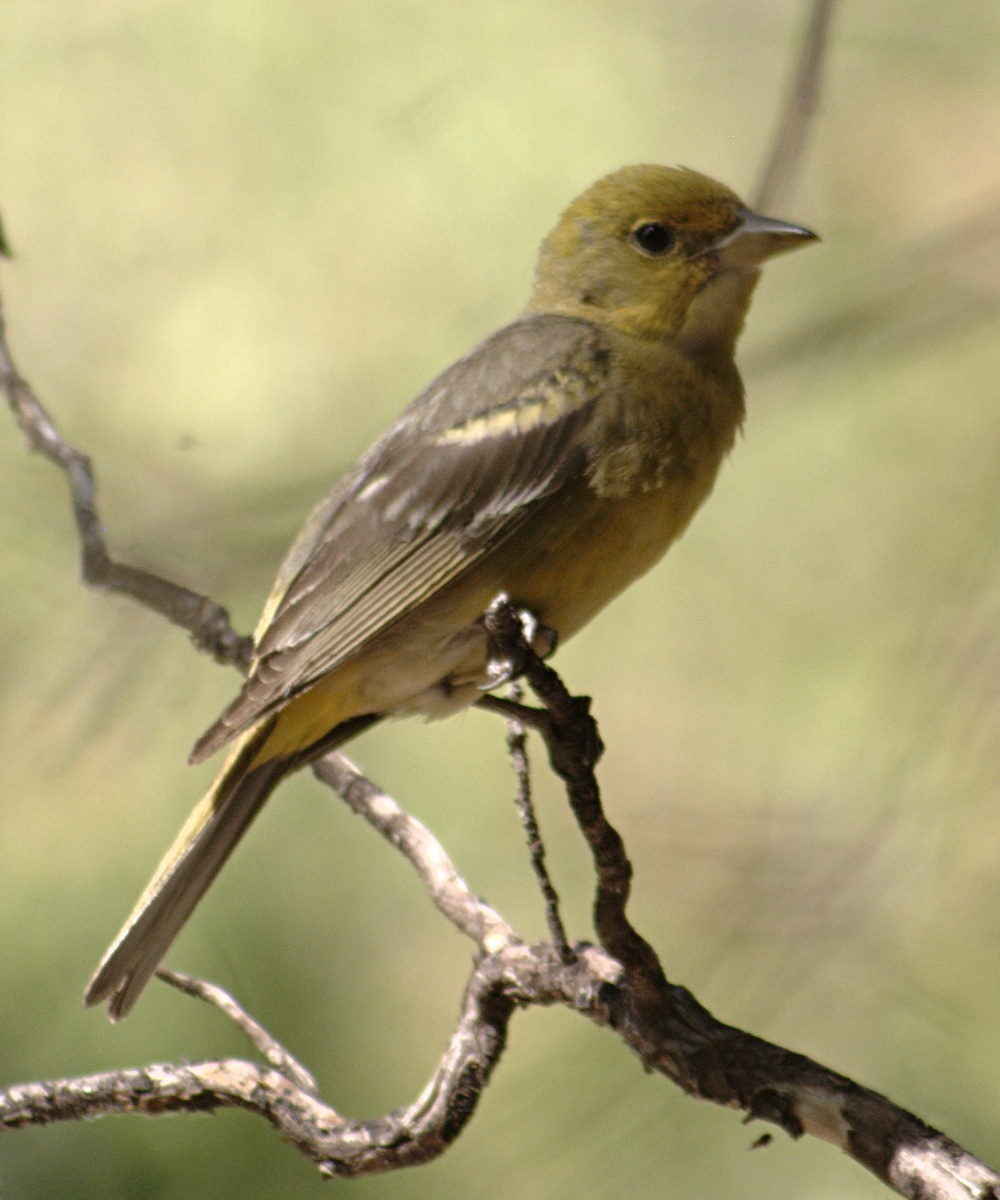
- Adult female Song

Conservation status
- Least Concern (IUCN 3.1)

Scientific classification
- Kingdom: Animalia
- Phylum: Chordata
- Class: Aves
- Order: Passeriformes
- Family: Cardinalidae
- Genus: Piranga
- Species: P. ludoviciana

Binomial name
- Piranga ludoviciana (Wilson, 1811)
- Range Summer breeding range Migration Winter non-breeding range

= Western tanager =

Species of bird (Piranga ludoviciana)

The western tanager (Piranga ludoviciana) is a medium-sized American songbird. Formerly placed in the tanager family (Thraupidae), it and other members of its genus are now classified in the cardinal family (Cardinalidae). The species' plumage and vocalizations are similar to other members of the cardinal family.

== Taxonomy ==
The western tanager was illustrated and formally described by American ornithologist Alexander Wilson in 1811 under the binomial name Tanagra ludoviciana from a specimen collected on the Lewis and Clark Expedition (1804–1806). The type locality is Kamiah, Idaho. The specific epithet is from the Late Latin ludovicianus for "Louis". The name is from Louisiana, the 18th-century French administrative district of New France, rather than the modern state. The western tanager is now placed in the genus Piranga that was introduced by French ornithologist Louis Pierre Vieillot in 1808. The species is monotypic; no subspecies are recognized.

== Description ==
Measurements:

- Length: 6.3–7.5 in (16–19 cm)
- Weight: 0.8–1.3 oz (24–36 g)
- Wingspan: 11.5 in (29 cm)

Adults have pale, stout pointed bills, yellow underparts, and light wing bars. Adult males have a bright red face and a yellow nape, shoulder, and rump, with black upper back, wings, and tail; in non-breeding plumage, the head has no more than a reddish cast and the body has an olive tinge. Females have a yellow head and are olive on the back, with dark wings and tail.

The song of disconnected short phrases suggests an American robin's, but is hoarser and rather monotonous. The call is described as pit-er-ick.

Their breeding habitat is coniferous or mixed woods across western North America from the Mexico-U.S. border as far north as southern Alaska; thus, they are the northernmost-breeding tanager. They build a flimsy cup nest on a horizontal tree branch, usually in a conifer. They lay four bluish-green eggs with brown spots.

These birds migrate, wintering from central Mexico to Costa Rica. Some also winter in Southern California.

== Distribution and habitat ==
The breeding range of the western tanager includes forests along the western coast of North America from southeastern Alaska south to northern Baja California, Mexico. Western tanagers extend east to western Texas and north through central New Mexico, central Colorado, extreme northwest Nebraska, and areas of western South Dakota to southern Northwest Territories, Canada. The western tanager's wintering range stretches from central Costa Rica north through Nicaragua, Honduras, El Salvador, and Guatemala to southern Baja California Sur and extreme southeastern Sonora in western Mexico and to southern Tamaulipas in northeastern Mexico. Western tanagers do not typically occur in the Caribbean lowlands. They have been reported wintering further north and have been observed as far south as Panama. Vagrants are rare to casual in the eastern United States.

In addition to the plant communities listed above, western tanagers are reported from disturbed habitats. For instance, western tanagers were seen in an area of northwestern California that had been logged less than five years previously. Cutleaf burnweed (Erechtites glomerata) was characteristic of the youngest age class, while slightly older sites were composed predominantly of tanoak (Notholithocarpus densiflorus) with smaller amounts of snowbrush ceanothus (Ceanothus velutinus), whitebark raspberry (Rubus leucodermis), and Sierra gooseberry (Ribes roezlii). In addition, western tanagers were captured along the Rio Grande in New Mexico during spring and fall migration in an agricultural area composed primarily of alfalfa (Medicago sativa) and corn (Zea mays).

Western tanagers have also been observed in saltcedar (Tamarix species) communities and in Russian olive (Elaeagnus angustifolia) vegetation. In New Mexico, western tanagers were observed in nearly pure stands of saltcedar 10 to 23 ft (3–7 m) tall. Western tanagers were also observed in saltcedar communities during fall migration in along the Rio Grande. Ten western tanagers were observed among three sites composed of Russian olive in Colorado, Utah, and Idaho. All sites were dominated by Russian olive with cheatgrass (Bromus tectorum) comprising a substantial portion of the understory. Along the Rio Grande, western tanagers were most often captured during fall migration in vegetation with a Rio Grande cottonwood (Populus deltoides species wislizenii) overstory and a moderate to dense Russian olive understory.

== Behavior and ecology ==
Western tanagers migrate alone or in groups of up to 30 birds. On average, hatching-year western tanagers were captured later (early September) at Rio Grande Nature Center Rio Grande Nature Center than adult western tanagers (mid-August) during fall migration. Migration timing, condition of birds, and site differences in spring and fall migration were also addressed in this investigation.

=== Breeding ===
Western tanagers arrive on their breeding grounds in spring. Breeding usually occurs among birds two years or older, beginning in May and continuing into July, although some first-year western tanagers also breed. In the Sandia Mountains of north-central New Mexico, western tanagers were heard singing beginning in late May, and the first nest was found in early June. In public open-space areas in Boulder County, Colorado, the start of the western tanager breeding season was estimated as 28 May, and the peak of the breeding season, defined as at least 50% of western tanager nests active, was from 6 June to 1 July. In the Southwest, brooding generally begins in early May, while in the Northwest, brooding starts typically in mid-June. Brooding can begin earlier in British Columbia and Alberta than in the northwestern United States. An egg-laying date as early as 16 May in British Columbia was estimated by back calculation, and a complete egg set was observed as early as 26 May in Alberta.

Cup nests are built by the female, take about four or more days to construct, and are made from twigs, rootlets, grasses, and pine needles. No evidence has been found for second broods in western tanagers, but a review notes a nesting attempt after a failed nest in west-central Idaho, and suggests that renesting is a substantial source of late nesting attempts. In addition, renesting was suggested as the explanation for a few late nests observed in Boulder County, Colorado.

Clutch size is typically three to five eggs. Average clutch size in 10 nonparasitized nests in Boulder County was 3.8 eggs. Average clutch in the Southwest may be smaller than that of western tanagers nesting in the north. Egglaying generally takes about one day per egg. The female incubates the eggs for about 13 days, although shorter incubation periods have been reported. The young are fed by both parents, and typically fledge 11 to 15 days after hatching. Immature western tanagers have been observed with the parents at least two weeks after fledging.

Immature western tanagers initiate migration later than adult birds. Generally, western tanagers leave more northerly locations in late summer or early fall, while those in more southerly areas may stay as late as early November.

Reproductive success of western tanagers varies widely between studies and across years. An average annual nest success probability estimate is 0.186 over 3 years, with a low of 0.035 and a high of 0.349. In a northern Arizona study area, an average of 43% (n=7) of nests succeeded to the nestling stage. In Boulder County, nesting success varied from 11.3% to 75.3%, with an average of 51.8% over a 3-year period. Daily nest survival rate on ungrazed sites in northeastern New Mexico was 0.955, which was not significantly (p<0.05) different from the 0.973 daily nest survival rate found on grazed sites. Nest predation is the leading cause of nest failure. Predation rates ranged from 30% (n=48) in a study in New Mexico pinyon-juniper woodland to 86% (n=14) in a mixed-conifer forest in Idaho.

Western tanagers can live several years. The annual average survival rate is 0.753 and a return rate is 30.1% for western tanagers in west-central Idaho. A wild western tanager 7 years and 11 months old has been documented from banding data.

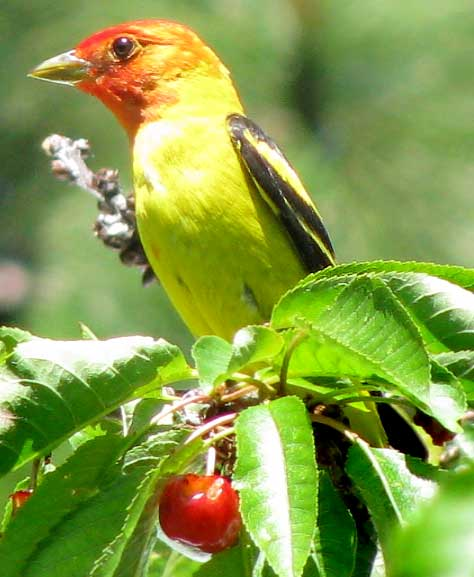
A male enjoying the fruits of a cherry tree.

==== Habitat ====
During the breeding season, western tanagers are found primarily in relatively open coniferous forests and mixed woodlands. During migration, western tanagers occur in more areas, including lowland woodlands of Southern California, desert oases, riparian areas, parks, and orchards. In the western tanager's wintering range, it occupies pine (Pinus spp.) and pine-oak (Quercus spp.) woodlands, as well as low-canopied scrub forests, forest edges, and coffee plantations.

Western tanagers breed at a wide range of elevations from about 183 ft (56 m) in the Northwest up to 10,000 ft (3,050 m). In the northern portion of their breeding range, western tanagers have been observed on sites over 8,300 ft (2,530 m) in Oregon down to sites as low as 183 ft (56 m) in Oregon's Central Willamette Valley. In the southern portion of their breeding range, western tanagers are more typical on high-elevation sites. They were observed on an Arizona site 8,270 ft (2,520 m) in elevation and on a site at 9,500 ft (2,900 m) in Nevada.

==== Nesting ====
Western tanagers nest in second-growth and mature conifer and mixed forests. They only breed in stands of pole- to large-sized trees and stands of pole- to medium-sized trees with >70% canopy cover. Nesting was confined to older second-growth (>40 years) and mature (120+ years) Douglas fir (Pseudotsuga menziesii) communities in the western Cascade Range in Oregon.

Western tanager nests are typically found in coniferous trees toward the end of horizontal branches and at heights greater than 10 ft (3 m); 79% of 43 western tanager nests in British Columbia were found in conifers, primarily Douglas fir. The deciduous trees most often used were quaking aspen (Populus tremuloides) and willows (Salix spp.). The position of their nests along the branches of deciduous trees was more variable than in conifers. On this site, 56% of nests were at heights from 21 to 36 ft (6.4–11 m). Of 9 western tanager nests in an Alberta study site, eight occurred in white spruce (Picea glauca) and one was found in quaking aspen. Nest height ranged from 20 to 42 ft (6.3–12.8 m), with a mean of about 30 ft (9.3 m). On average, nests were located 80% of the distance from the trunk to the tip of the branch. Of 49 western tanager nests found in a pinyon-juniper (Pinus-Juniperus spp.) woodland in northeastern New Mexico, 98% were in Colorado pinyon (P. edulis) and the remainder occurred in Douglas fir. On this site, nest trees averaged 24 ft (7.4 m) in height and over 8 in (21.9 cm) in diameter at breast height (dbh). The average height of nests was 18 ft (5.4 m). In a nearby mixed-conifer forest, nests were found in Douglas fir and ponderosa pine (P. ponderosa). Nest trees on this site averaged nearly 50 ft (15.1 m) in height and 13 in (32.7 cm) in dbh. The average nest height was 16 ft (4.93 m) and on average nests were located about 5 ft (1.49 m) from the tree stem and 3 ft (0.97 m) from the edge of the tree's foliage. Western tanager nests on a north-central New Mexico site occurred at heights from 8 to 15 ft (2–5 m), typically in white fir (Abies concolor) located in open areas. In Idaho, nests were found in conifers at an average height of 40 ft (12.3 m) and ranged from 8 to 55 ft (2.4–16.8 m). Of 58 nests at a Colorado study site, 54 occurred in ponderosa pine and four were found in Douglas fir. Nest height was significantly associated with tree height, with the mean nest height around 54% of tree height. On average, western tanager nests were located 63% of the distance between the trunk and the branch tip. This is closer to the bole than found in most studies, and the authors suggest that the conical shape of the ponderosa pine requires nests be placed closer in toward the trunk to provide cover. Canopy cover at nest sites averaged 71%, with a minimum of 31% cover.

==== Foraging habitat ====
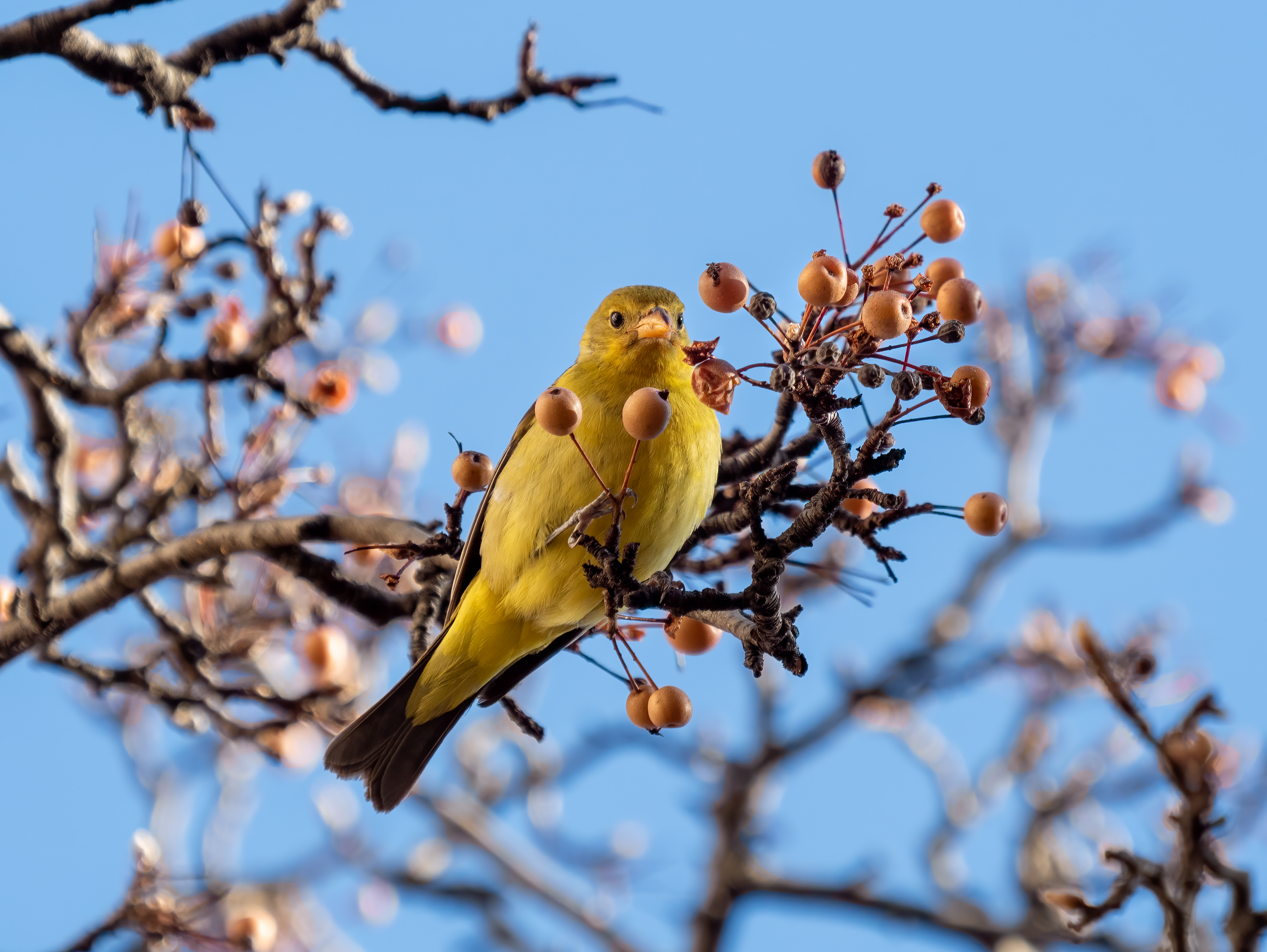
Female in a callery pear tree

Western tanagers forage in many habitats, in all successional stages from grass-forb communities to stands of large trees with greater than 70% cover. In western Oregon, they were not observed using the grass and forb successional stages, but were observed foraging in areas not used for nesting, such as shrub/sapling and young second-growth (16–40 years old) stands typically made up of Douglas fir.

Although western tanagers forage in many habitats, they are typically observed foraging in forest canopies. For instance, in an area of California primarily dominated by giant sequoia (Sequoiadendron giganteum), western tanagers spent 60% to 75% of their foraging time above 35 ft (10 m) and less than 2% of foraging time below 12 ft (4 m). In coniferous forests of western Montana, they were typically observed foraging in canopy foliage above 26 ft (8 m). In mixed conifer-oak forests in California, they foraged from 16 to 92 ft (5–28 m).

In primarily Douglas fir-dominated vegetation in British Columbia, the occurrence of western tanager foraging in various portions of trees and the size of those trees were investigated. This species perched on stems less than 1 in (<2.5 cm) in diameter in 96.9% of observations. Nearly 85% of observations were either near the branch tip or in the middle of the branch. Western tanagers foraged on larger trees, with nearly 80% of observations on trees with a trunk diameter of more than about 8 in (20.0 cm), and over 80% of observations occurring on trees 33 ft (10 m) or taller. They used taller trees and trees with larger diameters significantly more than their availability in all silvicultural treatments analyzed.

Western tanagers may preferentially forage on certain species. In a California study of foraging and habitat relationships of insect-gleaning birds in mixed conifer-oak forest, they used white fir more and incense-cedar (Calocedrus decurrens) less than would be expected from their availability. Sugar pine (Pinus lambertiana), Douglas-fir, and California black oak (Quercus kelloggii) were used slightly more than their availability, but this was not considered significant, since 95% confidence intervals overlapped with use in accordance with availability. Ponderosa pine was used in proportion to its availability. In mostly Douglas fir-dominated communities in British Columbia, western tanagers were observed foraging in Douglas fir in 88.9% of observations, ponderosa pine in 7.4% of observations, and in living trees of other species in 3.7% of observations. Over all sites, the preference for Douglas-fir was significantly (p<0.001) greater than availability. When sites were separated by the various silvicultural treatments, only the 3-year-old light cut (Douglas fir and ponderosa pine larger than 14 in (35 cm) in dbh and other species larger than 6 in (15 cm) dbh were harvested) and the selectively logged (20% of 6- to 8-in dbh (15.2–20.3 cm) trees, 25% of 8- to 12-in dbh (20.3–30.5 cm) trees, 45% of 12- to 24-inch dbh (30.5–61.0 cm) trees, and 75% of >24-inch dbh (>61.0 cm) trees were removed) sites showed significantly greater use of Douglas fir by western tanagers than would be expected from availability. They were reported foraging on quaking aspen, as well as balsam poplar (P. balsamifera ssp. balsamifera), speckled alder (Alnus rugosa), and white spruce (Picea glauca) in central Alberta.

Although western tanagers occur in stands of varying ages and have been observed in higher densities on young sites, they are typically detected more often in relatively mature stands. For example, they appear to occur more often in mature (50–60 years old) and old-growth (100+ years) quaking aspen than young (<23 years old) trembling aspen stands in the Prince Rupert Forest Region of British Columbia. In Alberta, western tanager was detected significantly (p<0.001) more often in old (120+ years old) quaking aspen mixed-wood stands than in mature (50–65 years old) or young (20–30 years old) mixed-wood stands. The same trend has been found in other communities. In Washington, western tanager was observed on sites dominated by older (35-year- and 60-year-old) red alder (A. rubra), but not on sites containing young (4-year- and 10-year-old sites) red alder. Although western tanagers were fairly common on recently harvested sites, they were detected at the most points in "mature" and "old-growth" ponderosa pine in northern Idaho and western Montana. Western tanagers had higher densities in mature (33 ft, >10 m tall) conifer plots and young conifer/mature conifer transition plots than in young (3–33 ft, 1–10 m tall) conifer plots in British Columbia. Western tanagers occurred at an average density of 53.2 birds/100 ha in sawtimber Douglas fir stands (>80–150 years old), 37.0/100 ha in mature Douglas fir stands (>100 years old), and 3.1/100 ha in sapling Douglas fir stands (<20 years old) in northern California. Although they occurred at higher densities in young Douglas fir forest in Oregon, the stands were 40 to 72 years old. Mature forest was from 80 to 120 years old, and old-growth forest was 200 to 525 years old.

==== Stand structure and composition ====
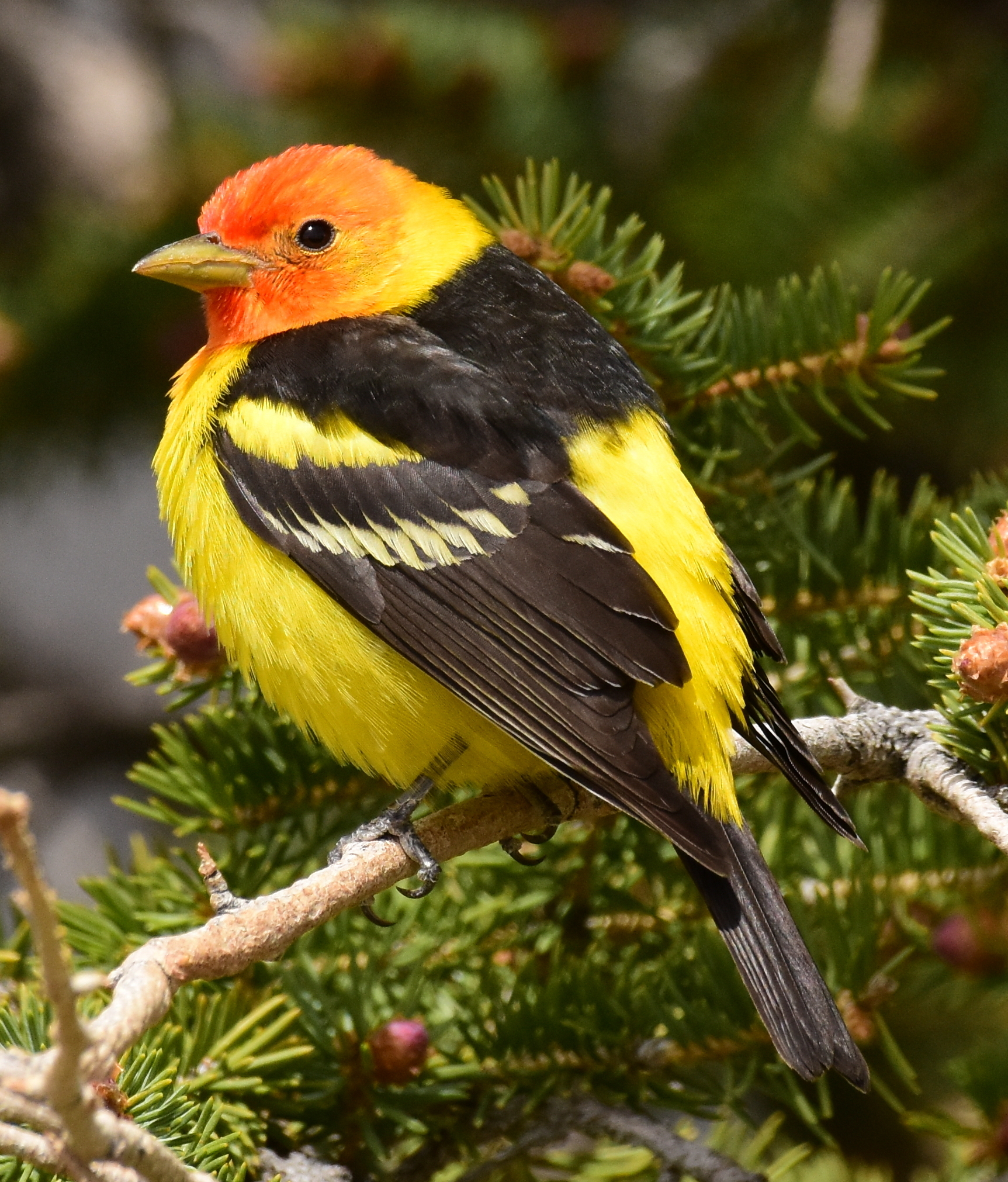
Western tanager in the Seedskadee National Wildlife Refuge

Western tanagers appear to prefer large trees, which are considered an important component of stands for them. In addition, western tanagers were significantly positively associated with large saw timber (>20% cover, >21 in [>53.2 cm] mean dbh) and significantly negatively associated with pole timber (>20% cover; conifers >10 ft [>3 m] tall and 4–12 inh (10.2–30.4 cm) mean dbh; hardwoods 10–50 ft (3–15 m) tall and 4–12 in mean dbh) stands dominated by Douglas fir, western hemlock (Tsuga heterophylla), and red alder in the central Oregon Coast Ranges. In primarily Douglas fir-dominated communities in British Columbia, western tanagers foraged in trees >33 ft (>10 m) tall in more than 80% of observations, and nearly 80% of foraging observations were in trees with trunk diameters greater than 8 in (>20.0 cm). In addition, western tanagers foraged in trees smaller than 33 ft (10 m) tall less than their availability.

Most evidence suggests that western tanagers prefer areas with moderate canopy cover. They avoid continuous canopy. Stands with large trees and 40 to 69% canopy cover are an optimal western tanager habitat. Large trees and canopy cover ≥70% is considered suitable habitat, while areas with large trees and <40% cover are categorized as marginal habitat. In sapling/pole and mature ponderosa pine habitats of the Black Hills in South Dakota, western tanagers occurred at the highest densities in stands with intermediate (40%-70%) canopy cover. In 35- to 45-year-old Douglas fir and red alder-dominated stands, an average of 322% more western tanagers were detected on sites logged to a density of 240 to 320 trees/ha, and an average of 363% more of them were detected on sites logged to a density of 180 to 220 trees/ha, compared to controls with 410 to 710 trees/ha. The difference in western tanager detections between the logging treatments and the control grew larger over time. In Arizona, western tanagers occurred at significantly higher densities (15.8/40 ha) in forest dominated by Douglas fir and ponderosa pine the year after logging to an average of 167.7 trees/ha compared to control stands (7.7/40 ha) with average tree density of 626.2 trees/ha. Western tanager densities on the treatment and control sites were more similar the following year. In British Columbia, western tanagers occurred at significantly higher densities after "light" logging on a site containing Douglas fir and ponderosa pine. The species apparently was positively influenced by thinning a ponderosa pine stand by 20% in Arizona. In the Sierra Nevada of California, western tanagers occurred at a higher density in an open-canopied (602 trees >10 cm dbh/ha) mixed-conifer stand consisting of Jeffrey pine (Pinus jeffreyi), lodgepole pine (P. contorta), white fir, and incense-cedar compared to a closed-canopied (994 trees >10 cm dbh/ha) mixed conifer stand of incense-cedar and white fir. This same pattern was found in open- (420 trees > 10 cm dbh/ha) and closed-canopied (658 trees > 10 cm dbh) California red fir (Abies magnifica var. magnifica) stands.

Western tanagers have been reported to prefer areas with a diverse forest structure, but importance of lower forest layers is unclear. In the Black Hills of South Dakota, they were significantly more abundant in multistoried habitats with bur oak (Q. macrocarpa) and quaking aspen/paper birch (Betula papyrifera) under a ponderosa pine canopy than in sapling/pole or mature ponderosa pine stands with varying canopy cover. Reviews assert the importance of a diverse forest structure and a dense deciduous understory for western tanagers. In some areas, though, the influence of lower forest layers may be relatively insignificant. For example, removal of incense-cedar and white fir from 1 to 10 ft (0.3–3 m) tall in giant sequoia forests had little impact on western tanager density.

Western tanagers may associate with or avoid some plant species. For example, in mixed-wood forests in Alberta, western they were significantly positively associated with conifer density. The western tanager was also considered a conifer-associated species in quaking aspen-dominated and mixed quaking aspen-conifer communities in British Columbia. Western tanagers' preference for multistoried habitats in the Black Hills may be related to the bur oak and quaking aspen/paper birch midstory. Western tanagers were not significantly related with abundance of pineland dwarf mistletoe (Arceuthobium vaginatum ssp. cryptopodum) in ponderosa pine stands in central Colorado. The western tanager species was negatively associated with subalpine fir (A. lasiocarpa) cover in northern Rocky Mountain conifer forests.

=== Food and feeding ===
Western tanagers obtain their food by foliage gleaning and hawking. The degree to which each of these methods is used apparently varies across locations. For instance, in a California mixed conifer-oak forest consisting mainly of white fir, Douglas fir, incense-cedar, and California black oak, about 47% of western tanager foraging observations were gleaning, about 40% were hawking, and lunging and hovering occurred in about 6% and 7% of observations, respectively. In contrast, in the mainly Douglas fir-dominated communities of interior British Columbia, gleaning constituted 93.2% of western tanager foraging observations. Hawking only occurred in 3.7% of observations and hovering in 3.1%.

Western tanagers primarily glean from foliage. In the mixed conifer-oak woodland of California, 45% of their foraging observations were foliage gleaning. Western tanagers gleaned from twigs in 10% of observations and from branches in 5% of observations. Hawking constituted the remainder of western tanager foraging observations. In British Columbia, 88.3% of gleaning observations occurred on foliage, 10.5% on branches and twigs, and 1.2% on trunks.

Western tanagers eat fruits (~18%) and a wide range of insects (~82%). Fruits include hawthorn apples (Crataegus spp.), raspberries (Rubus spp.), mulberries (Morus spp.), elderberries (Sambucus spp.), serviceberries (Amelanchier spp.), and wild and cultivated cherries (Prunus spp.). They have been observed foraging on Perry's agave (Agave parryi) nectar. Reports of western tanager eating eucalyptus (Eucalyptus spp.) nectar, Russian olive fruits, and human-provided food, including bird seed and dried fruit, were summarized. Western tanagers are major consumers of western spruce budworms (Choristoneura occidentalis), and they have been observed eating Douglas fir tussock moth larvae (Orgyia pseudotsugata). Hymenopterans, mostly wasps and ants, constituted 75% of insects in western tanager stomachs in August. The other insects were beetles (Coleoptera, 12%), mainly click beetles (Elateridae) and woodborers (Bupestridae), true bugs (Hemiptera, 8%), grasshoppers (Orthoptera, 4%), and caterpillars (Lepidoptera, 2%).

== Predators ==
Several birds prey on western tanagers. Remains of a western tanager were found in a red-tailed hawk's (Buteo jamaicensis) nest in Colorado. In southwestern Idaho, western tanager remains were reported in one of over 170 prairie falcon (Falco mexicanus) nests observed. Northern goshawks (Accipiter gentilis), Mexican spotted owls (Strix occidentalis spp. lucida), sharp-shinned hawks (A. striatus) and Cooper's hawks (A. cooperii) are also western tanager predators. Accipiter hawks (Accipitrinae) and jays (Corvidae) are major predators of western tanagers. Domestic cats also preyed on western tanagers in British Columbia.

Clark's nutcrackers (Nucifraga columbiana), northern pygmy owls (Glaucidium gnoma), great horned owls (Bubo virginianus), and jays such as scrub jays (Aphelocoma species), pinyon jays (Gymnorhinus cyanocephalus), and Steller's jays (Cyanocitta stelleri) are typical avian predators of western tanager nests. Other reported nest predators include black bears (Ursus americanus), prairie rattlesnakes (Crotalus viridis), and bullsnakes (Pituophis catenifer).

Western tanager nests are parasitized by brown-headed cowbirds (Molothrus aster). Parasitism rates can be high, and can dramatically reduce the number of western tanagers fledged per nest.
