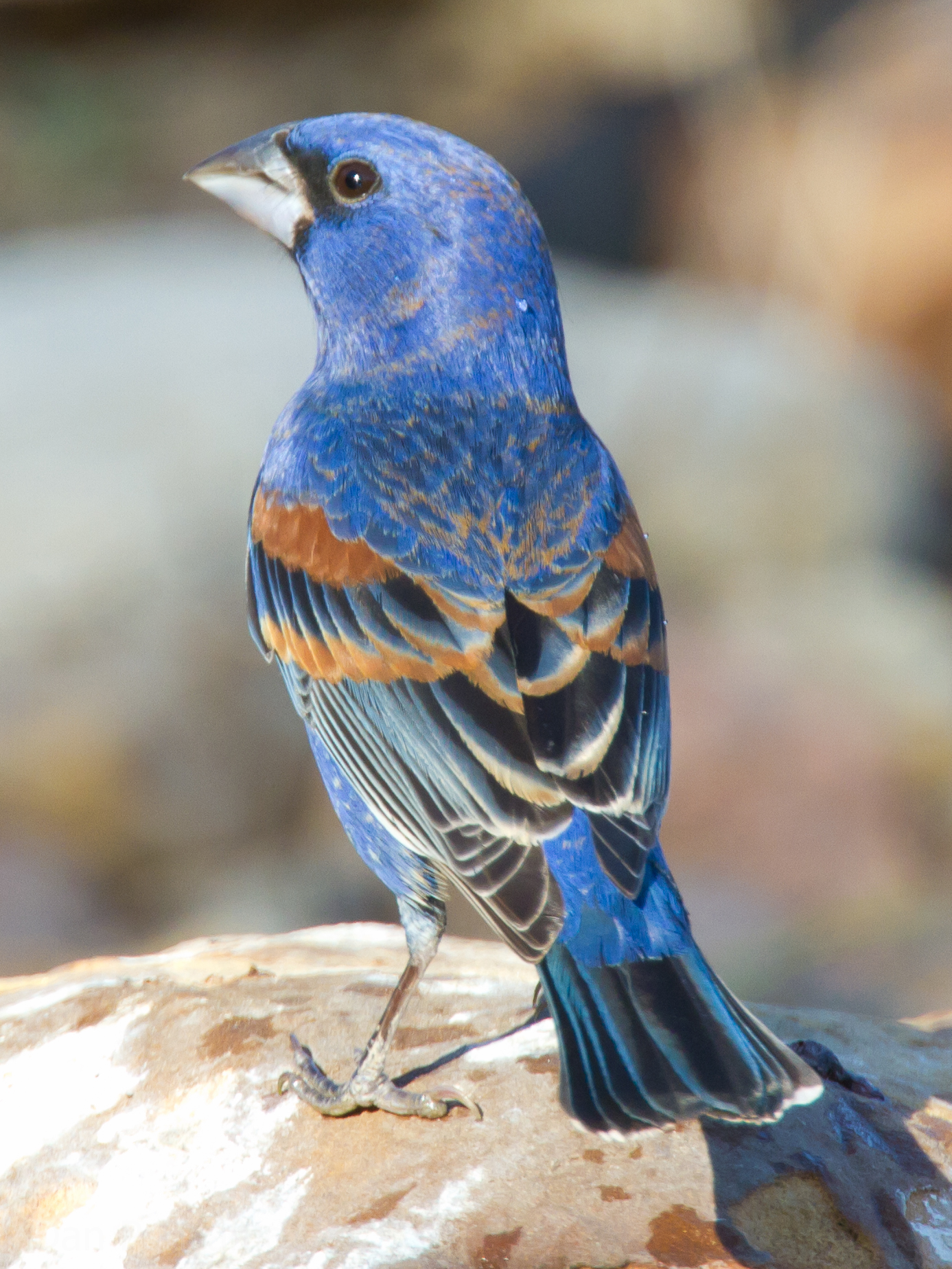
- Adult male
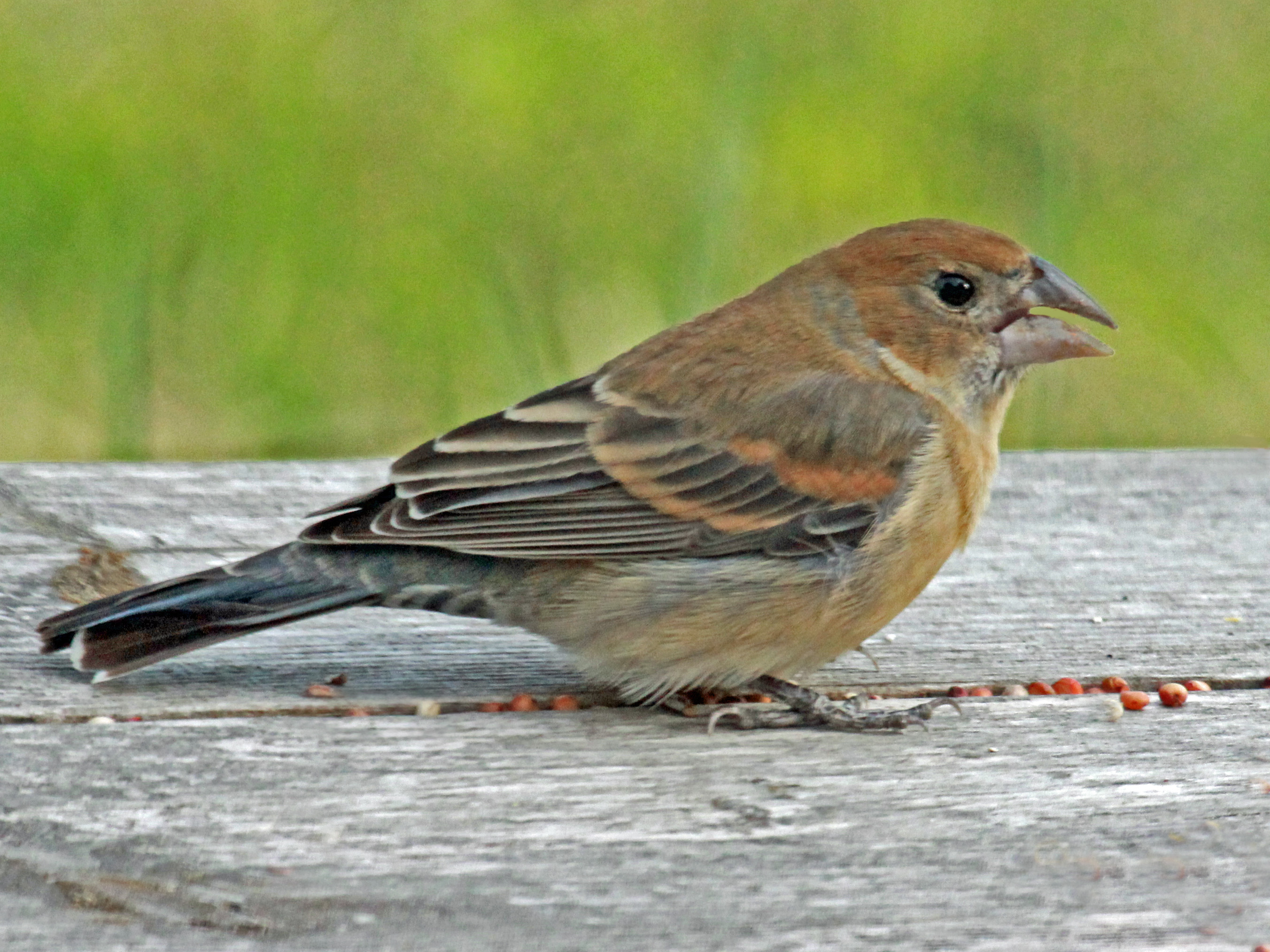
- Adult female

Conservation status
- Least Concern (IUCN 3.1)

Scientific classification
- Kingdom: Animalia
- Phylum: Chordata
- Class: Aves
- Order: Passeriformes
- Family: Cardinalidae
- Genus: Passerina
- Species: P. caerulea

Binomial name
- Passerina caerulea (Linnaeus, 1758)
- Breeding Migration Year-round Nonbreeding

Synonyms
- Loxia caerulea Linnaeus, 1758; Guiraca caerulea (Linnaeus, 1758)

= Blue grosbeak =

Species of bird

The blue grosbeak (Passerina caerulea) is a medium-sized North American passerine bird in the cardinal family Cardinalidae. It is mainly migratory, wintering in Central America and breeding in northern Mexico and the southern United States. The male is blue with two brown wing bars. The female is mainly brown with scattered blue feathers on the upperparts and two brown wing bars.

== Taxonomy ==
The blue grosbeak was formally described by the Swedish naturalist Carl Linnaeus in 1758 in the tenth edition of his Systema Naturae under the binomial name Loxia caerulea. The specific epithet caerulea is the Latin word for "blue", "azure-blue", "sky-blue" or "dark-blue". Linnaeus based his own description on the "blew gross-beak" described and illustrated by Mark Catesby in his The Natural History of Carolina, Florida and the Bahama Islands. The book had been published in 1729–1732. Catesby gave the location as Carolina and Linnaeus specified America. The type location is now restricted to South Carolina.

Some taxonomists placed the blue grosbeak in its own monotypic genus Guiraca but in 2001 a molecular phylogenetic study of mitochondrial DNA sequences found that the blue grosbeak, in spite of being physically larger, is nested within Passerina and was most closely related to the lazuli bunting. The species is therefore now placed with the North American buntings in Passerina, a genus that was introduced by the French ornithologist Louis Pierre Vieillot in 1816.

Seven subspecies are recognized:

- P. c. caerulea (Linnaeus, 1758) – southeast and south central USA
- P. c. interfusa (Dwight & Griscom, 1927) – west central USA and north Mexico
- P. c. salicaria (Grinnell, 1911) – southwest USA and northwest Mexico
- P. c. eurhyncha (Coues, 1874) – central and south Mexico
- P. c. chiapensis (Nelson, 1898) – south Mexico to Guatemala
- P. c. deltarhyncha (Van Rossem, 1938) – west Mexico
- P. c. lazula (Lesson, R, 1842) – south Guatemala to northwest Costa Rica

== Description ==
The male blue grosbeak is deep blue, with both black and brown on its wings. The female is mostly brown. Both sexes are distinguished by their large, deep bill and double wing bars. These features, as well as the grosbeak's relatively larger size, distinguish this species from the indigo bunting. Length can range from 14 to 19 cm (5.5 to 7.5 in) and wingspan is from 26 to 29 cm (10 to 11 in). Body mass is typically from 26 to 31.5 g (0.92 to 1.11 oz).

== Distribution and habitat ==
This is a migratory bird, with nesting grounds across most of the southern half of the United States and much of northern Mexico. The range of this species has expanded northward over the past century or two, likely aided by the clearing of forests by humans. Blue grosbeaks are now regularly observed nesting across much of the Midwest and Northeastern United States.

They are uncommon within their range, migrating south to Central America and in very small numbers to northern South America; the southernmost record comes from eastern Ecuador. Vagrant birds have appeared as far north as New England and Eastern Canada.

This species is found in partly open habitat with scattered trees, riparian woodland, scrub, thickets, cultivated lands, woodland edges, overgrown fields, or hedgerows.

== Behavior and ecology ==
=== Breeding ===
The blue grosbeak nests in a low tree or bush or a tangle of vegetation, usually about 1–2.5 m (3.3–8.2 ft) above ground, often at the edge of an open area.

=== Feeding ===
It eats mostly insects, but it will also eat snails, spiders, seeds, grains, and wild fruits. The blue grosbeak forages mainly on the ground.

=== Lifespan ===
No estimates exist for the average longevity of this species. A blue grosbeak captured in Ohio in 2017 was confirmed to be 10 years old, surpassing the previously known record for the species at seven years.

== Gallery ==
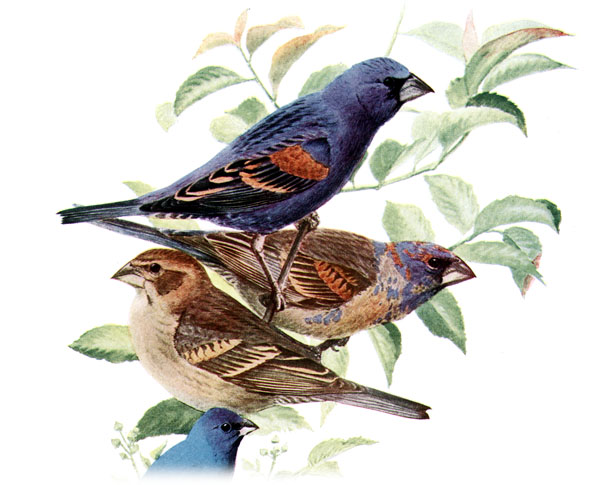
Male (upper), female (lower)

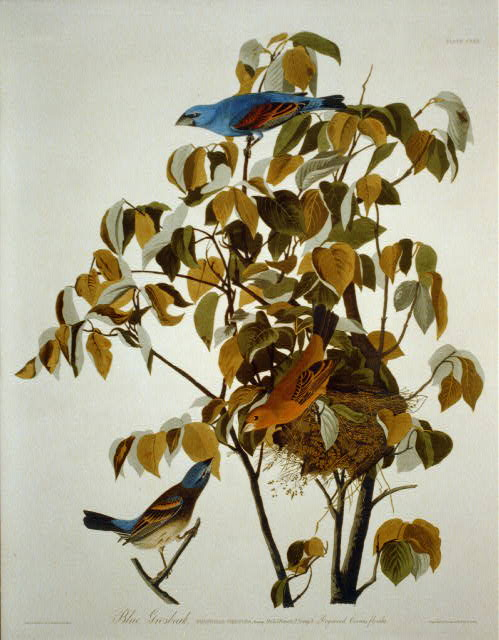
Blue Grosbeak in Birds of America

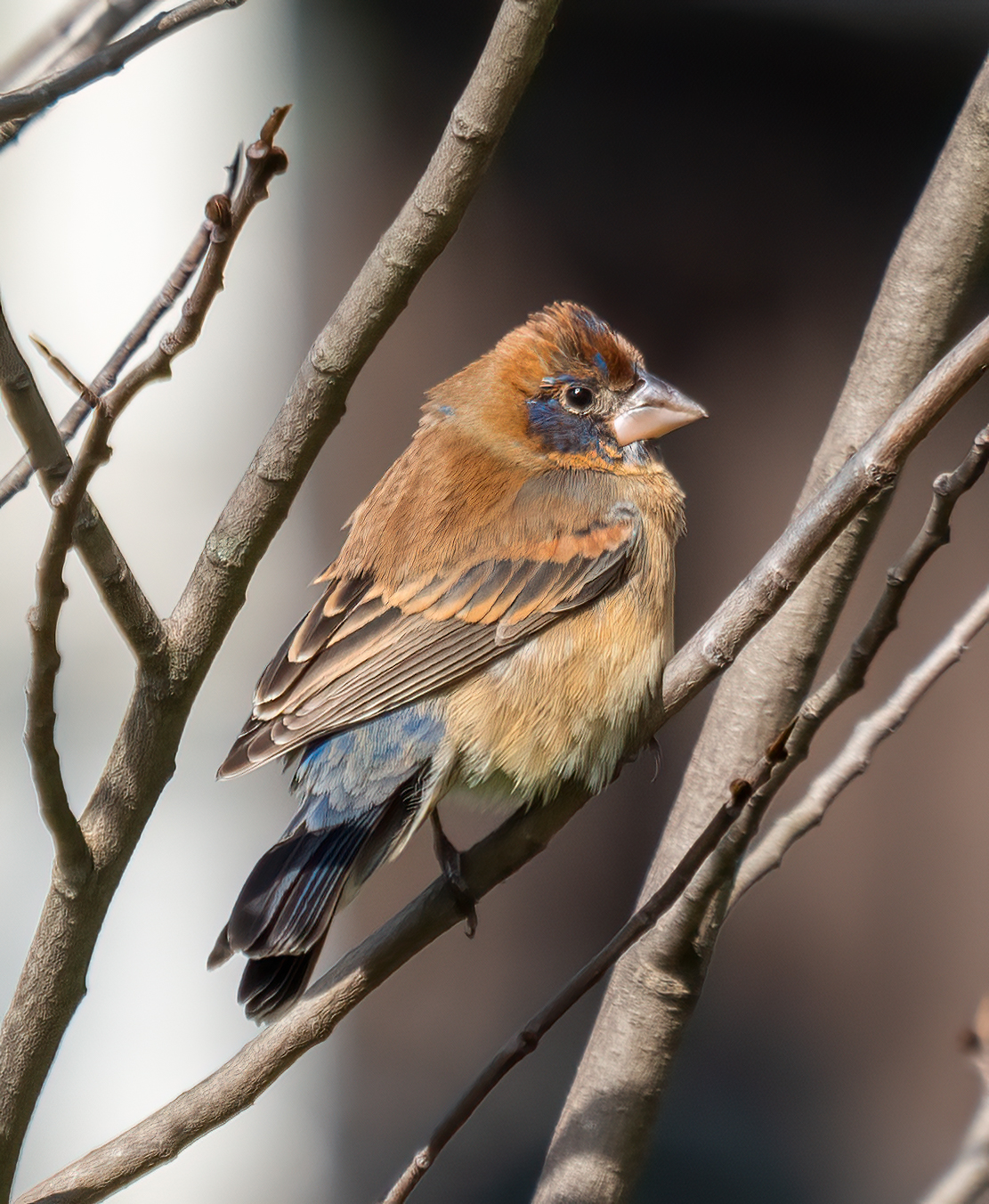
Immature male with partially blue face and tail

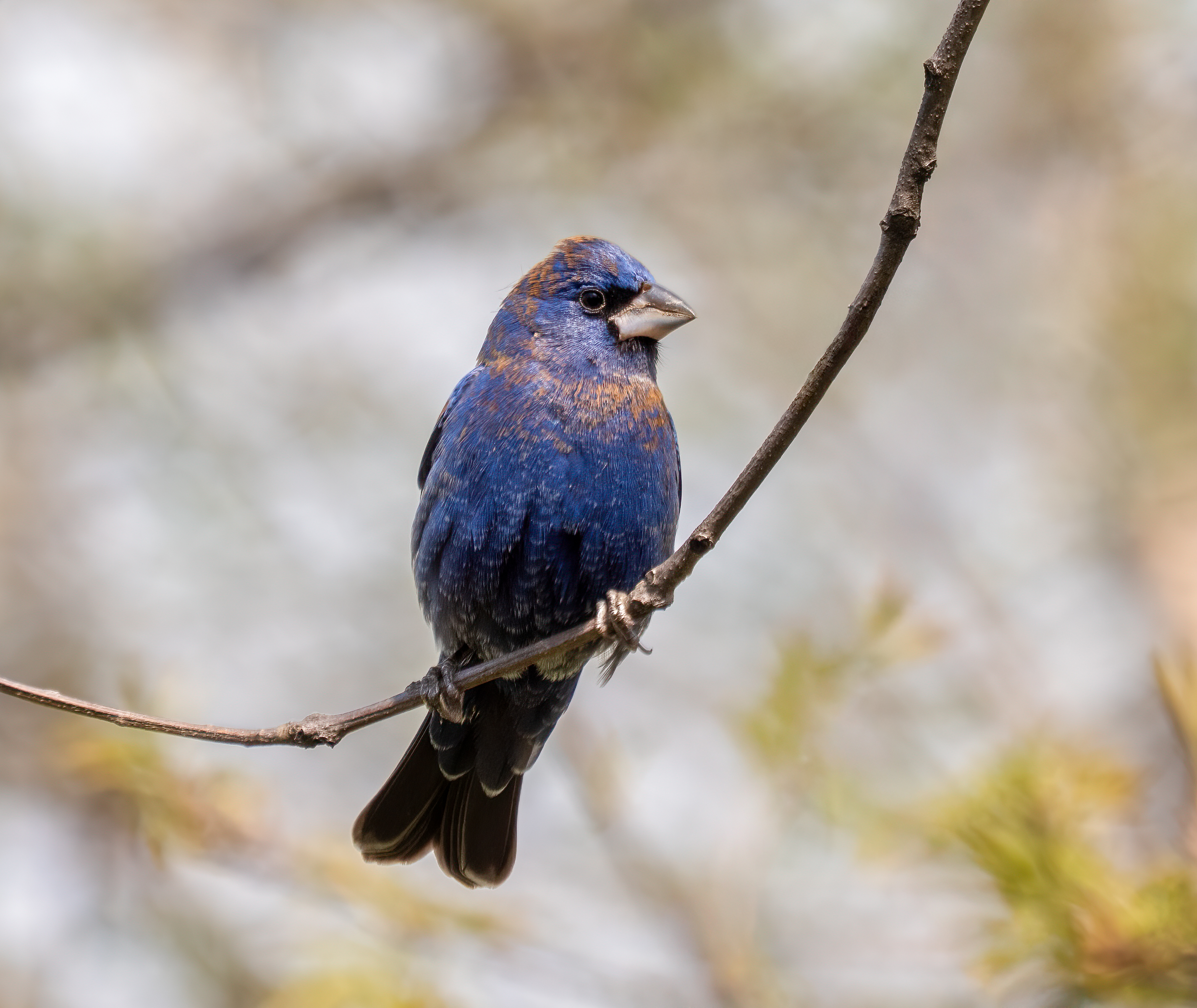
Molting adult male
