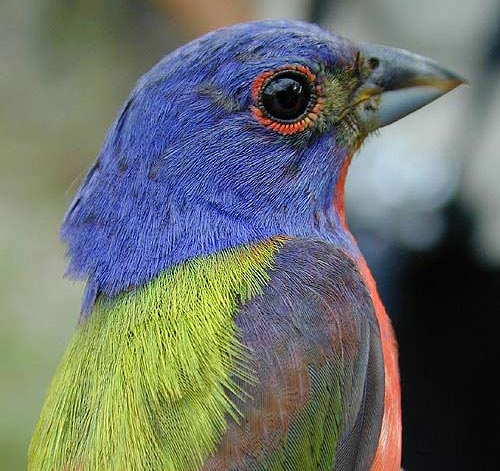
- Painted bunting (Passerina ciris)

Scientific classification
- Domain: Eukaryota
- Kingdom: Animalia
- Phylum: Chordata
- Class: Aves
- Order: Passeriformes
- Family: Cardinalidae
- Genus: Passerina; Vieillot, 1816

Type species
- Tanagra cyanea Linnaeus, 1766

Species
- See text

Synonyms
- Guiraca; Linaria Bartram, 1791

= Passerina =

Genus of birds in the cardinal family

The genus Passerina is a group of birds in the cardinal family (Cardinalidae). Although not closely related to the buntings in the family Emberizidae, they are sometimes known as the North American buntings.

The males show vivid colors in the breeding season; the plumage of females and immature birds is duller. These birds go through two molts in a year; the males are generally less colorful in winter. They have short tails and short slim legs. They have smaller bills than other Cardinalidae; they mainly eat seeds in winter and insects in summer.

The blue grosbeak (P. caerulea) was once placed in the monotypic genus, Guiraca.

== Taxonomy and list of species ==
The genus Passerina was introduced by the French ornithologist Louis Pierre Vieillot in 1816. The type species was designated in 1840 as the indigo bunting (Passerina cyanea) by the English zoologist George Robert Gray. The genus name is from the Latin passerinus meaning "sparrow-like".

The genus contains 7 species:

Genus – seven species
Common name	Scientific name and subspecies	Range	Size and ecology	IUCN status and estimated population
Blue grosbeak Male Female	Passerina caerulea (Linnaeus, 1758) Seven subspecies: P. c. caerulea (Linnaeus, 1758); P. c. interfusa (Dwight & Griscom, 1927); P. c. salicaria (Grinnell, 1911); P. c. eurhyncha (Coues, 1874); P. c. chiapensis (Nelson, 1898); P. c. deltarhyncha (Van Rossem, 1938); P. c. lazula (Lesson, R, 1842)	southern half of the United States and much of northern Mexico, migrating south to Central America and in very small numbers to northern South America; the southernmost record comes from eastern Ecuador.	Size: Habitat: Diet:	LC
Indigo bunting Male Female	Passerina cyanea (Linnaeus, 1766)	southern Canada to northern Florida during the breeding season, and from southern Florida to northern South America during the winter.	Size: Habitat: Diet:	LC
Lazuli bunting Male Female	Passerina amoena (Say, 1822)	southern Canada to northern Texas, central New Mexico and Arizona, and southern California.	Size: Habitat: Diet:	LC
Varied bunting Male Female	Passerina versicolor (Bonaparte, 1838)	Arizona, New Mexico, and Texas in the United States south throughout Mexico as far as Oaxaca	Size: Habitat: Diet:	LC
Painted bunting Male Female	Passerina ciris (Linnaeus, 1758) Two subspecies: P. c. ciris – (Linnaeus, 1758); P. c. pallidior – Mearns, 1911	southern Arizona, southern New Mexico, southern and eastern Texas, Oklahoma, Arkansas, Louisiana, northern Florida, coastal Georgia, the southern coast and inland waterways such as the Santee River of South Carolina and northern Mexico.	Size: Habitat: Diet:	LC
Rose-bellied bunting Male	Passerina rositae (Lawrence, 1874)	Isthmus of Tehuantepec in the Mexican states of Oaxaca and Chiapas	Size: Habitat: Diet:	NT
Orange-breasted bunting Male	Passerina leclancherii Lafresnaye, 1840	Mexico	Size: Habitat: Diet:	LC
