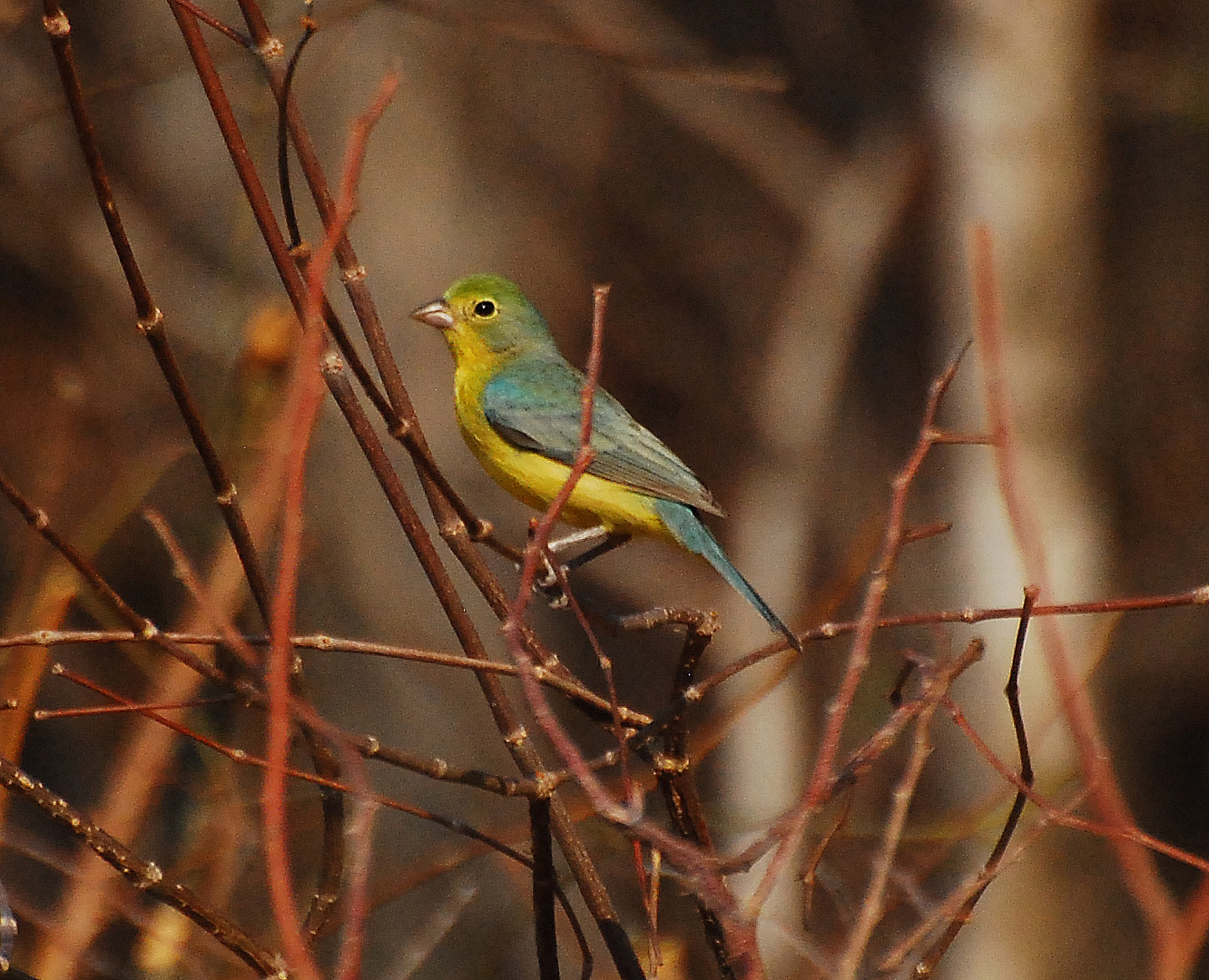

Conservation status
- Least Concern (IUCN 3.1)

Scientific classification
- Kingdom: Animalia
- Phylum: Chordata
- Class: Aves
- Order: Passeriformes
- Family: Cardinalidae
- Genus: Passerina
- Species: P. leclancherii

Binomial name
- Passerina leclancherii Lafresnaye, 1840
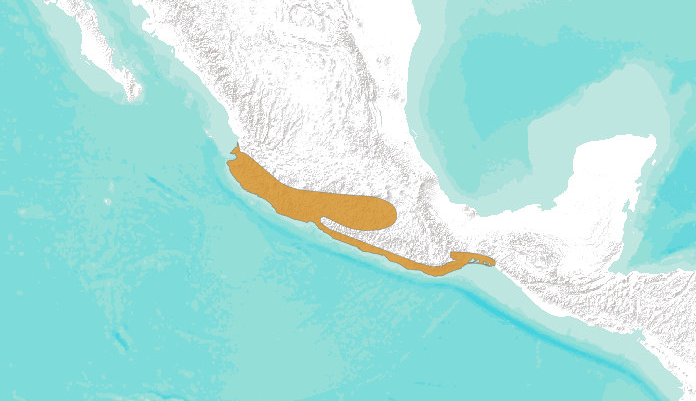

= Orange-breasted bunting =

Species of bird

The orange-breasted bunting (Passerina leclancherii) is a species of passerine bird in the family Cardinalidae. It is endemic to Mexico, where its natural habitats are subtropical or tropical dry forests and subtropical or tropical dry shrubland. With its wide range and large total population, the International Union for Conservation of Nature considers it as being of "least concern".

== Description ==
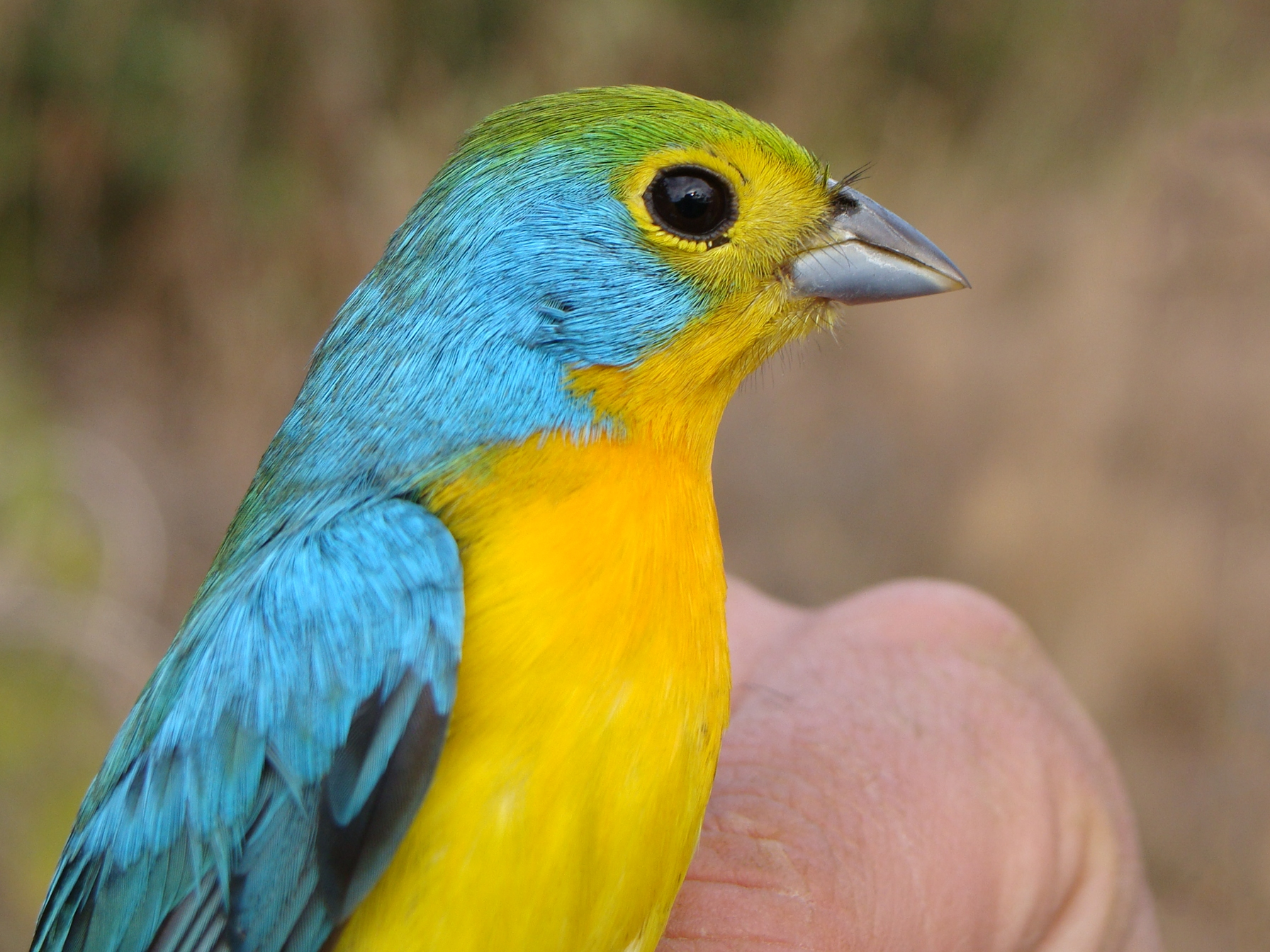
Male orange-breasted bunting in definitive alternate (breeding) plumage

The orange-breasted bunting grows to a length of about 12.5 cm (5 in) and is slightly smaller than the rose-bellied bunting (Passerina rositae), which shares its range. The adult male has a pale green crown, turquoise blue nape and upper parts, often tinged with green, and a turquoise tail. The lores, eye-ring and underparts are canary yellow, deepening to golden-orange on the breast. The adult female has greyish-green upper parts and yellow underparts. The iris is dark brown, and the beak and legs are grey. The song is a rather plaintive warble, rather slower and less drawn out than that of other members of the genus.

== Distribution and habitat ==
The orange-breasted bunting is endemic to Mexico. Its range extends from the Pacific coast in southern Nayarit, Jalisco, Michoacán and Guerrero to western Chiapas, and inland to the western part of Puebla, an area of about 276,000 km^{2} (107,000 mi^{2}). It inhabits tropical dry forest and arid scrubland, thorny thickets, bushy deciduous woodland, clearings and woodland edges, at altitudes up to about 900 m (3,000 ft). It has a patchy distribution, not being present in some areas of apparently suitable habitat. It is more abundant in secondary growth than in undisturbed forest. The species was introduced to the Hawaiian island of Oahu in 1941 but did not become established, and was extirpated by 1952.

== Ecology ==
The birds form small groups when foraging or may forage in pairs. The diet of this species has not been studied, but in general, buntings in this genus are seed-eaters, with some fruit and invertebrates being eaten. Birds in captivity will consume white millet, hemp seed and thistle seed, as well as hard sweet apples, ant cocoons and mealworms. Breeding takes place in the wet season in May and June. The nest is a cup-shaped structure formed of rootlets, grasses and dry leaves, with a softer lining and is built in a low bush or thick scrub. A clutch of three or four bluish-white or greenish-white eggs are laid.

== Status ==
This bird has a wide range and large total population. No particular threats have been identified and the population seems stable, so the International Union for Conservation of Nature has assessed its conservation status as being of "least concern".
