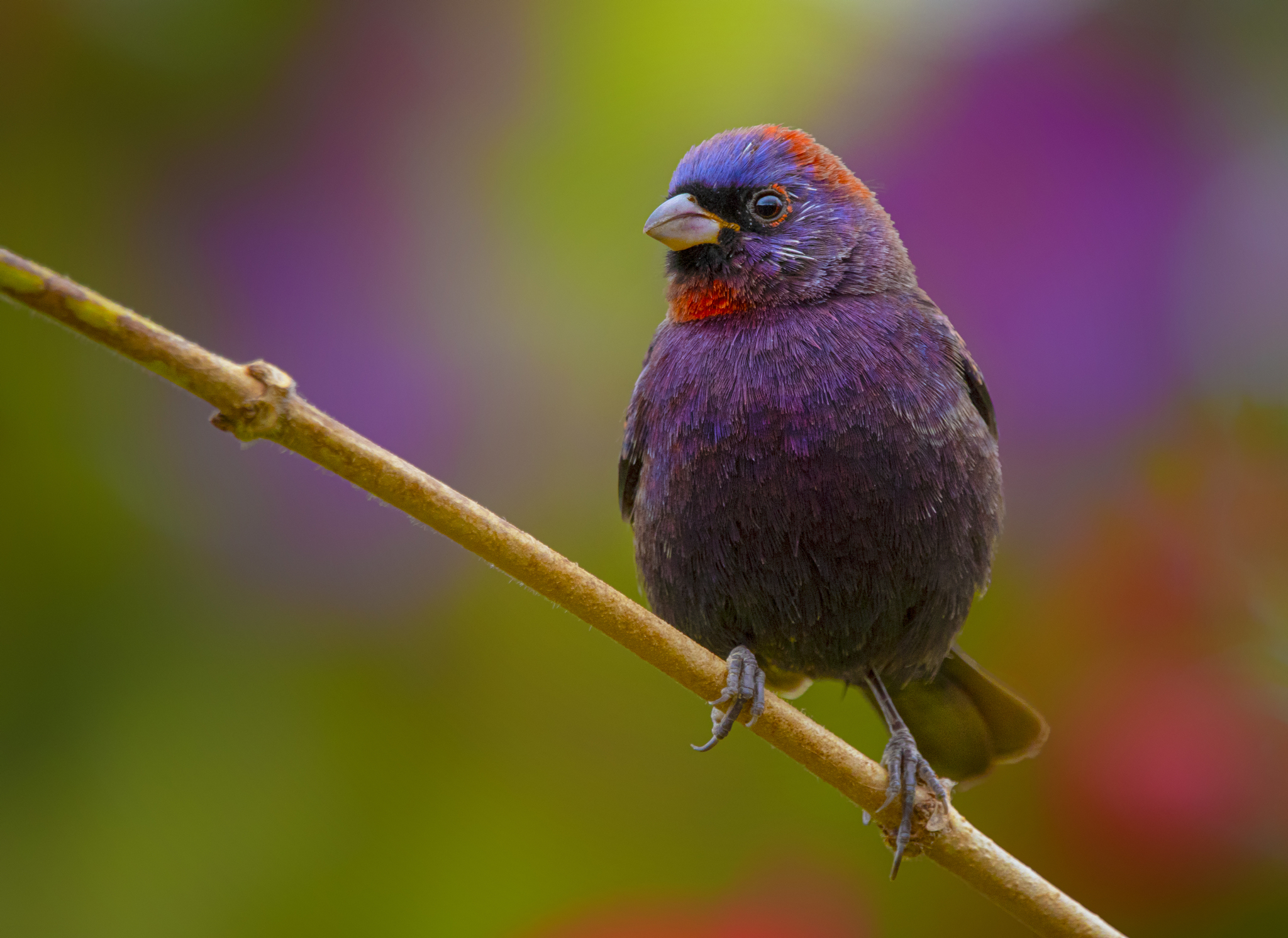
- Male

Conservation status
- Least Concern (IUCN 3.1)

Scientific classification
- Kingdom: Animalia
- Phylum: Chordata
- Class: Aves
- Order: Passeriformes
- Family: Cardinalidae
- Genus: Passerina
- Species: P. versicolor

Binomial name
- Passerina versicolor (Bonaparte, 1838)
- Breeding Year-round Nonbreeding

= Varied bunting =

Species of songbird

The varied bunting (Passerina versicolor) is a species of songbird in the cardinal family, Cardinalidae.

The range of the varied bunting stretches from the southern parts of Arizona, New Mexico, and Texas in the United States south throughout Mexico as far as Oaxaca. Small disjunct populations occur in the state of Chiapas in Mexico and southeastern Guatemala. This stocky bird has a short tail and rounded bill. It is 11–14 centimetres (4.3–5.5 in) long, has a wingspan of 21 centimetres (8.3 in), and weighs 11–13 grams (0.39–0.46 oz). Breeding males are purple-red with a bright red patch on the nape, which becomes browner in the fall. Females are plain light brown, resembling the female indigo bunting but lacking streaking on the breast. Varied buntings inhabit deserts and xeric shrublands, preferring thorny brush thickets, thorn forests, scrubby woodlands, and overgrown clearings. They forage on the ground for insects, fruit, and seeds. Varied buntings weave open-cup nests of grass and spider webs in the outer branches of thorny shrubs, usually near water. Females lay two to five bluish-white to bluish-green eggs, which they incubate for about fourteen days. The young are fully feathered after 10 days and are ready to leave the nest several days later.

== Images and Descriptions ==
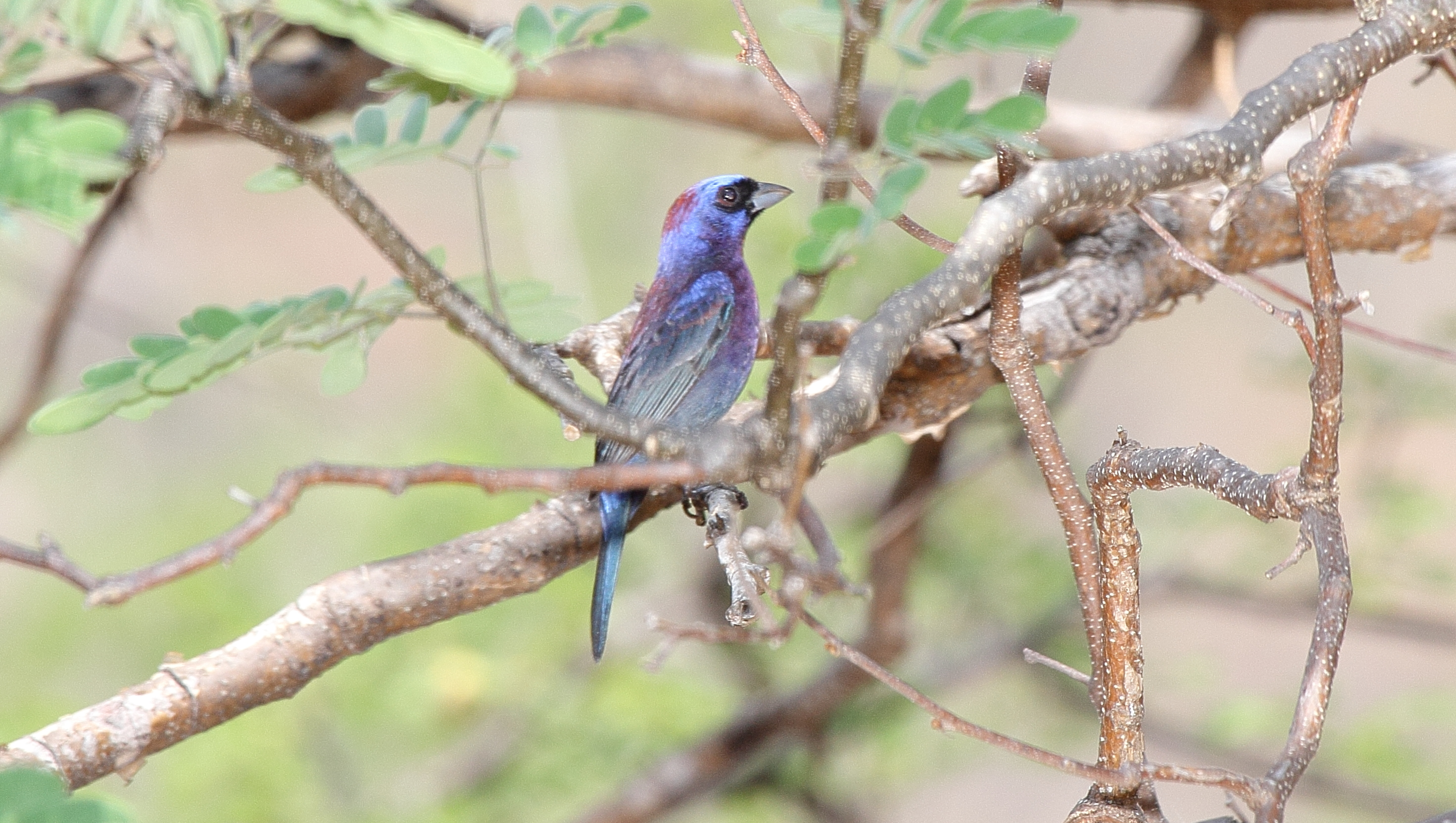
Passerina versicolor
