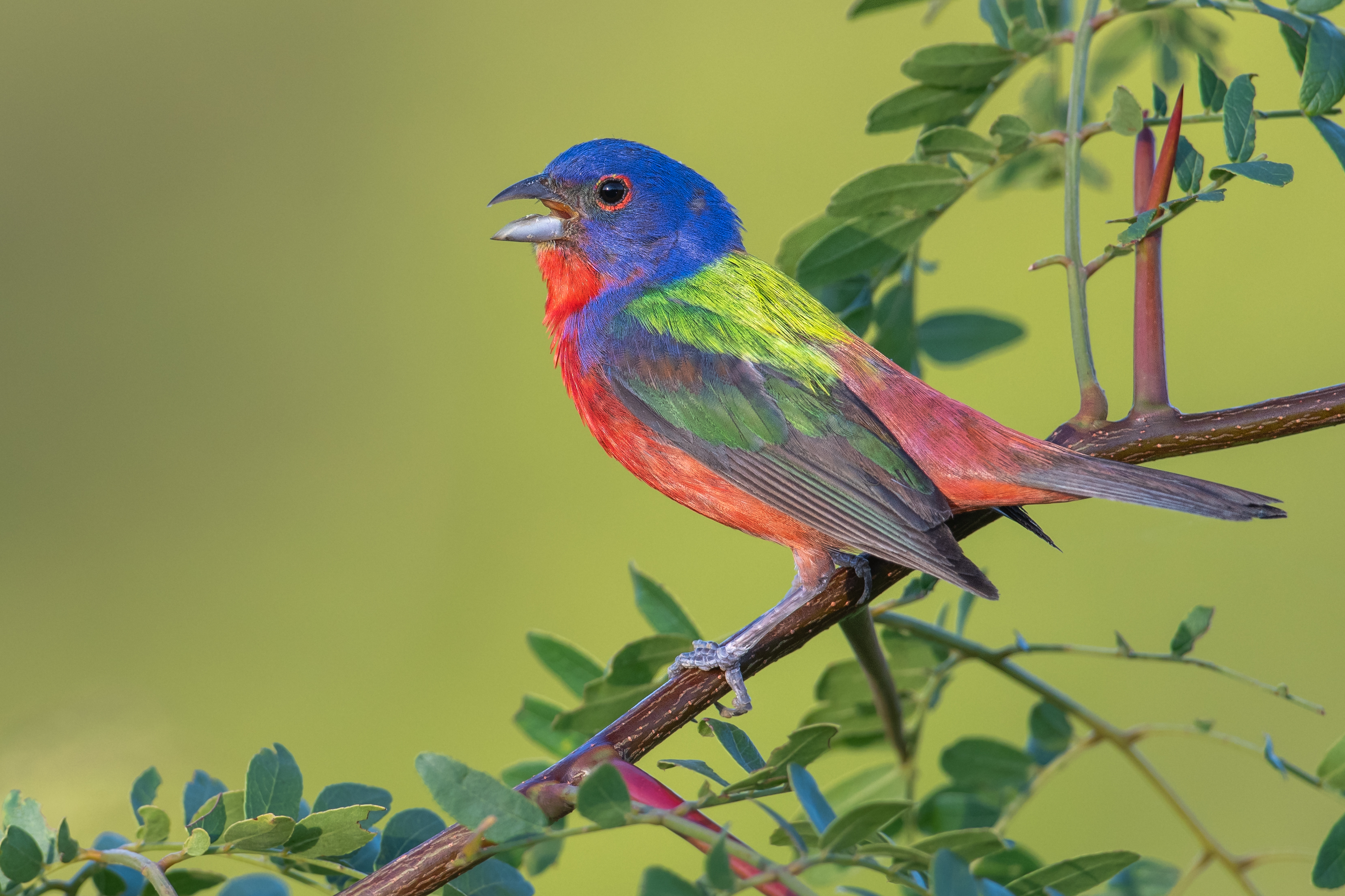
- Male

Conservation status
- Least Concern (IUCN 3.1)

Scientific classification
- Kingdom: Animalia
- Phylum: Chordata
- Class: Aves
- Order: Passeriformes
- Family: Cardinalidae
- Genus: Passerina
- Species: P. ciris

Binomial name
- Passerina ciris (Linnaeus, 1758)
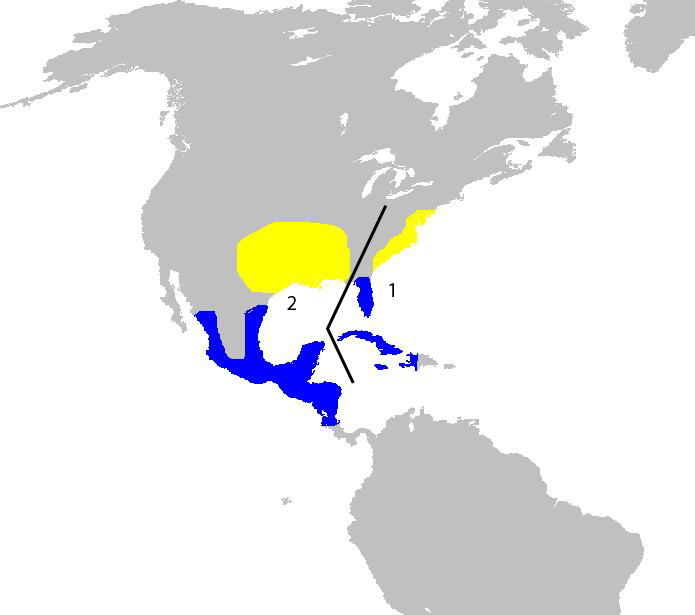
- Range of P. ciris Breeding range Wintering range

Synonyms
- Emberiza ciris Linnaeus, 1758

= Painted bunting =

Species of bird native to North America

The painted bunting (Passerina ciris) is a species of bird in the cardinal family, Cardinalidae. It is native to North America. The bright plumage of the male develops beginning in the second year of life; in the first year, they can be distinguished from the female only by close inspection.

== Taxonomy ==
The painted bunting was formally described in 1758 by the Swedish naturalist Carl Linnaeus in the tenth edition of his Systema Naturae under the binomial name Emberiza ciris. Linnaeus based his account mainly on the "Painted Finch" that had been described and illustrated in 1730 by the English naturalist Mark Catesby in his book The Natural History of Carolina, Florida and the Bahama Islands. Linnaeus specified the type locality as America but this was restricted to the state of South Carolina by the American Ornithologists' Union in 1931. The specific epithet ciris is the Latin name for a mythical bird, from Ancient Greek κειρις/keiris for an unidentified bird. The painted bunting is now one of seven species placed in the genus Passerina that was introduced in 1816 by the French ornithologist Louis Pierre Vieillot.

Two subspecies are recognised:

- P. c. ciris (Linnaeus, 1758) – southeast USA
- P. c. pallidior Mearns, 1911 – central south USA and north Mexico

The painted bunting is also called the Mexican canary, painted finch, pope, or nonpareil.

== Description ==
The male painted bunting is often described as the most beautiful bird in North America and as such has been nicknamed nonpareil, or "without equal". Its colors, dark blue head, green back, red rump, and underparts, make it extremely easy to identify, but it can still be difficult to spot since it often skulks in foliage even when it is singing. The plumage of female and juvenile painted buntings is green and yellow-green, serving as camouflage. Once seen, the adult female is still distinctive, since it is a brighter, truer green than other similar songbirds. Adult painted buntings can measure 12–14 cm (4.7–5.5 in) in length, span 21–23 cm (8.3–9.1 in) across the wings and weigh 13–19 g (0.46–0.67 oz).

The juveniles have two inserted molts in their first autumn, each yielding plumage like an adult female. The first starts a few days after fledging, replacing the juvenile plumage with an auxiliary formative plumage; and the second a month or so later giving the formative plumage.

Painted bunting eggs are pale blue-white speckled or spotted with brown. Three to four eggs (or occasionally five) appear from March to July in cup-shaped nests usually built in brush or low trees, usually 3 to 6 feet from the ground but up to 12 feet.

== Distribution and habitat ==
The painted bunting occupies typical habitat for a member of its family. It is found in thickets, woodland edges with riparian thickets, shrubbery and brushy areas. In the east, the species breeds in maritime hammocks and scrub communities. Today, it is often found along roadsides and in suburban areas, and in gardens with dense, shrubby vegetation. The wintering habitat is typically the shrubby edges along the border of tropical forests or densely vegetated savanna. The breeding range is divided into two geographically separate areas. These include southern Arizona, southern New Mexico, southern and eastern Texas, Oklahoma, Arkansas, Louisiana, northern Florida, coastal Georgia, the southern coast and inland waterways such as the Santee River of South Carolina and northern Mexico. They winter in South Florida, Cuba, the Bahamas, along both coasts of Mexico and through much of Central America. Occasionally, vagrants may appear further north, including to Washington, D.C. and New York, Pennsylvania, and New Jersey. The bird is also found every few years as far north as New Brunswick, Canada. Genetic analyses showed that the species can be divided into three main groups on their breeding grounds: a western, central and eastern group.

== Behavior ==
Painted buntings are shy, secretive and often difficult to observe with the human eye, though can be fairly approachable where habituated to bird feeders. Males sing in spring from exposed perches to advertise their territories. They also engage in visual displays including flying bouncingly like a butterfly or in an upright display, body-fluff display, bow display and wing-quiver display. These displays are used in antagonistic conflicts with other males or in breeding displays for females, with females rarely engaging in displays. Occasionally, males may physically clash with each other and may even kill each other in such conflicts. When their breeding season has concluded, buntings migrate by night over short to medium distances. Western birds (Arizona and northern Mexico) molt in mid-migration, while eastern birds tend to molt before they migrate.

=== Feeding ===
Painted buntings often feed by hopping along the ground, cautiously stopping every few moments to look around. They regularly eat insects and seeds of grasses, such as Panicum, of sedges such as Carex, and forbs such as Amaranthus, Oxalis, and Euphorbia. In winter painted bunting eat seeds almost exclusively, but while breeding, and in feeding their nestlings, they mainly seek out small invertebrates, including spiders, snails, and insects such as grasshoppers and caterpillars. Sometimes they visit spider webs opportunistically to pick off insects caught in them.

=== Breeding ===
Painted buntings are mostly monogamous and are solitary or in pairs during the breeding season, but sometimes exhibit polygamy. The breeding season begins in late April and lasts through to early August, with activity peaking mid-May through to mid-July. The male arrives about a week before the female and starts to establish a small territory. The nest is typically hidden in low, dense vegetation and is built by the females and woven into the surrounding vegetation for strength. Each brood contains three or four gray-white eggs, often spotted with brown, which are incubated for around 10 days until the altricial young are hatched. The female alone cares for the young. The hatchlings are brooded for approximately 12 to 14 days and then fledge at that time. About 30 days after the first eggs hatch, the female painted bunting usually lays a second brood. Nests are often parasitized by cowbirds. Common predators at the nest of eggs, young, and brooding females are large snakes, including coachwhip snakes, eastern kingsnakes, eastern racers and black rat snakes. The painted bunting can live to over 10 years of age, though most wild buntings probably live barely half that long.

== Status ==
The male painted bunting was once a very popular caged bird, but its capture and holding have been illegal since the Migratory Bird Treaty Act of 1918. Trapping for overseas sale may still occur in Central America. Populations are primarily declining due to habitat being lost to development, especially in coastal swamp thickets and woodland edges in the east and riparian habitats in migration and winter in the Southeastern United States and Mexico.

== Gallery ==
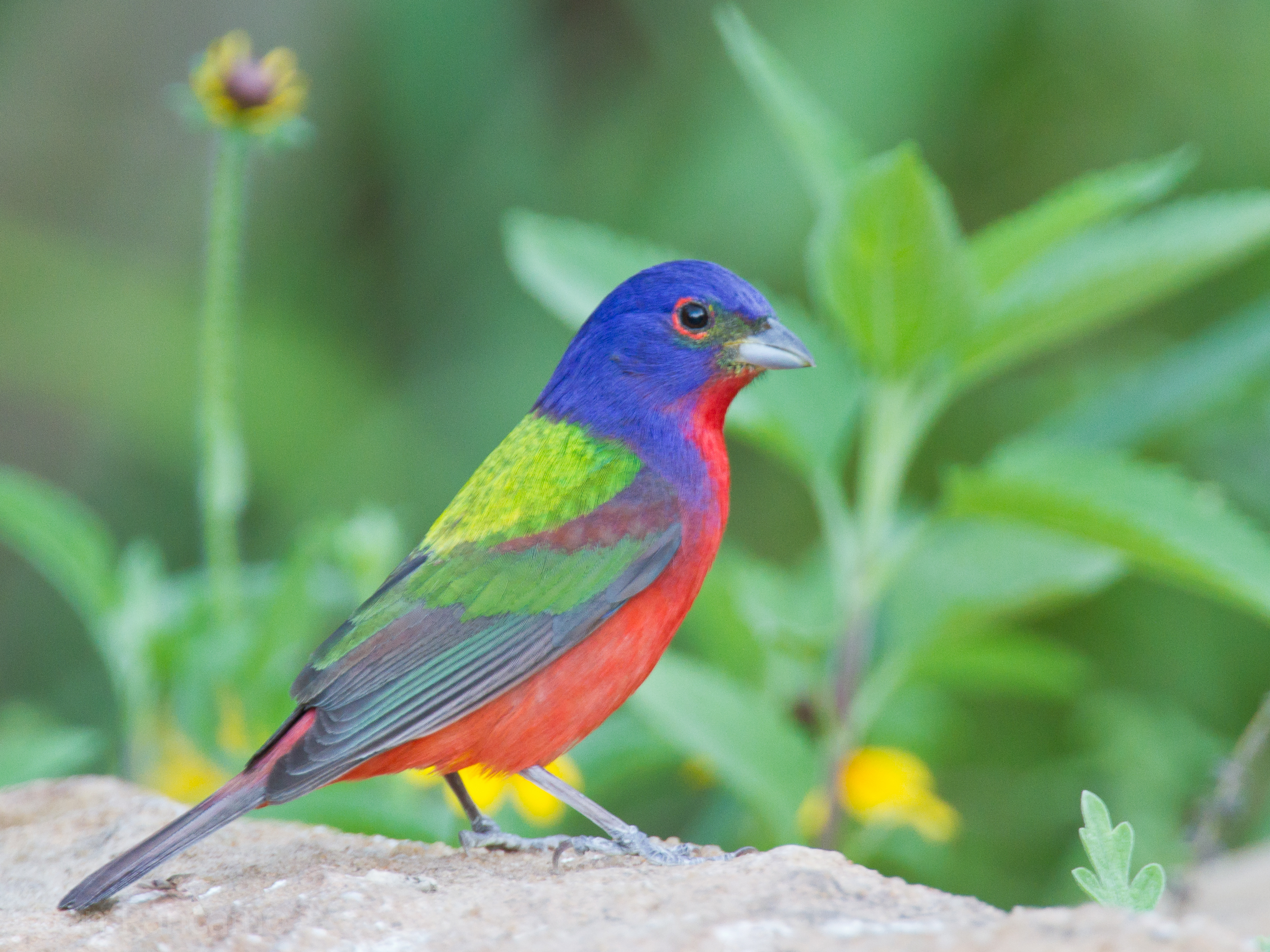
Quintana, Texas, male

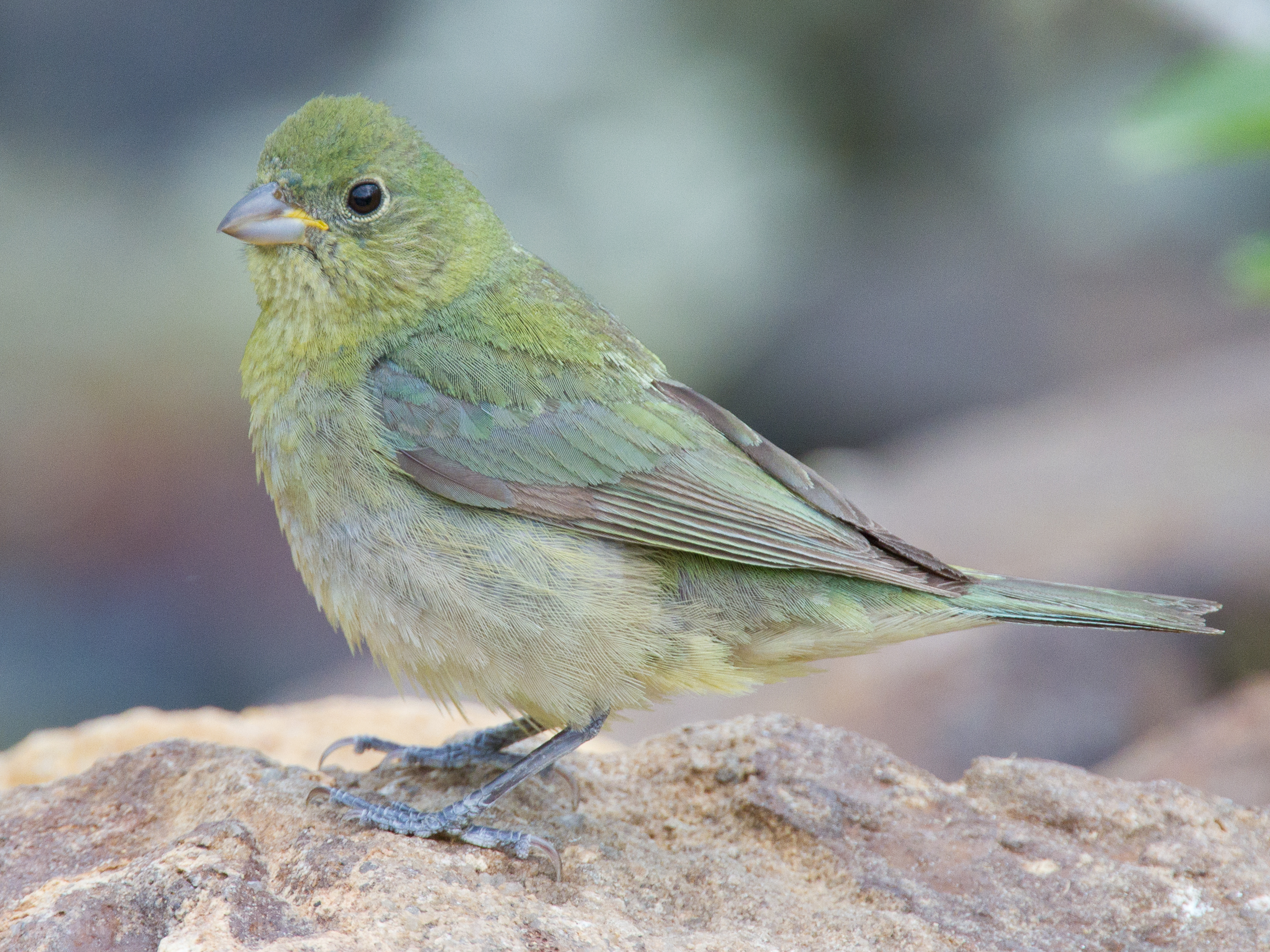
Female

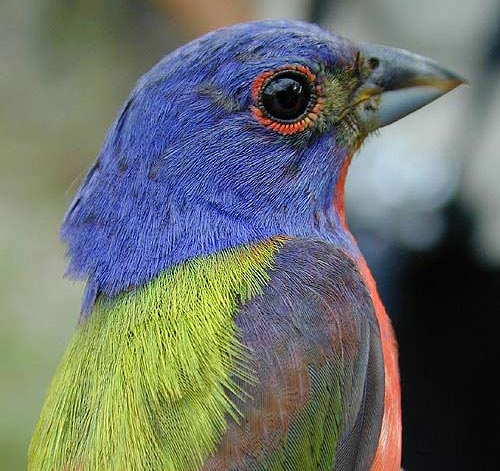
Male

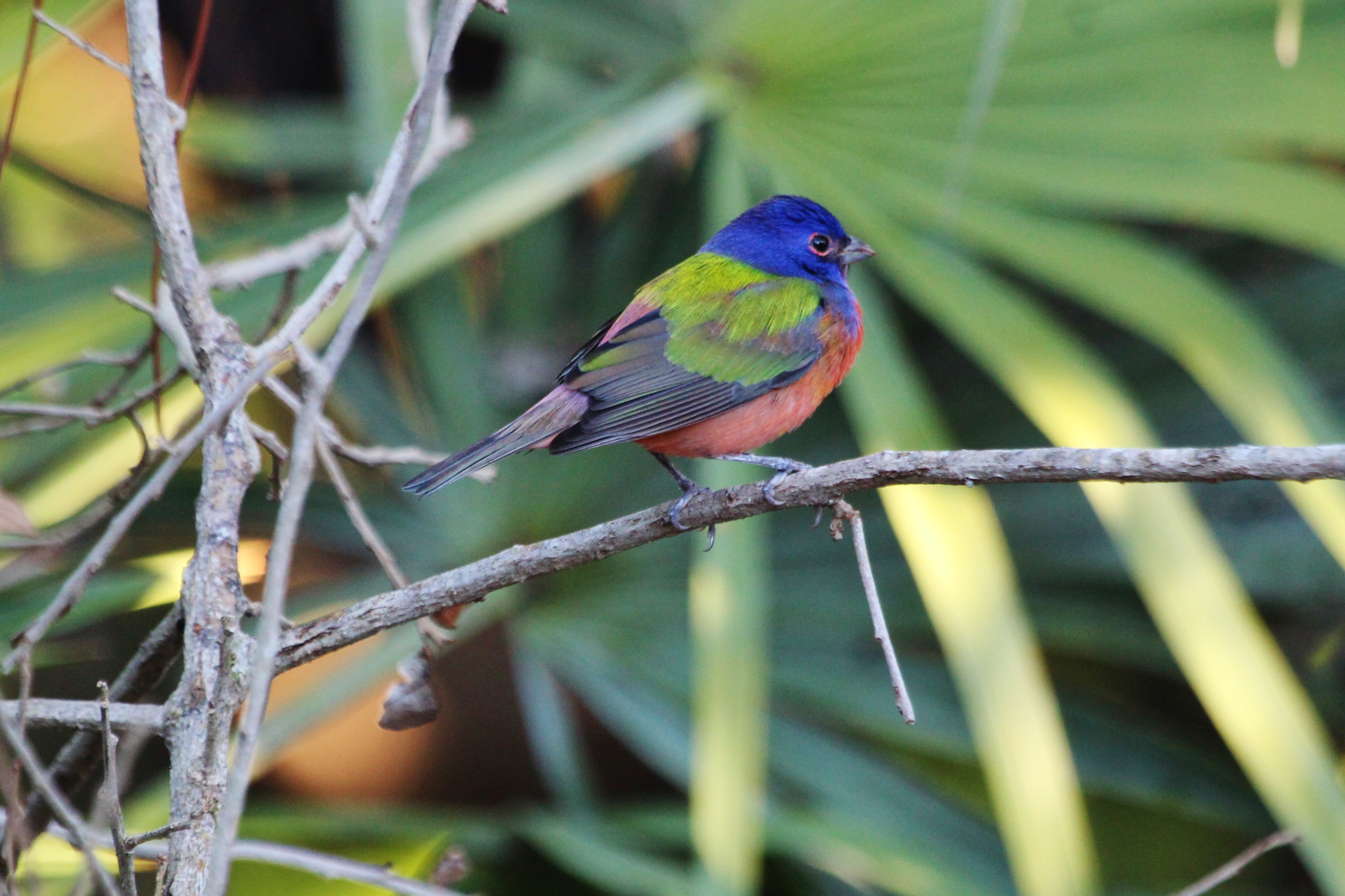
A wintering male painted bunting at the Okeeheelee Nature Center, Florida.

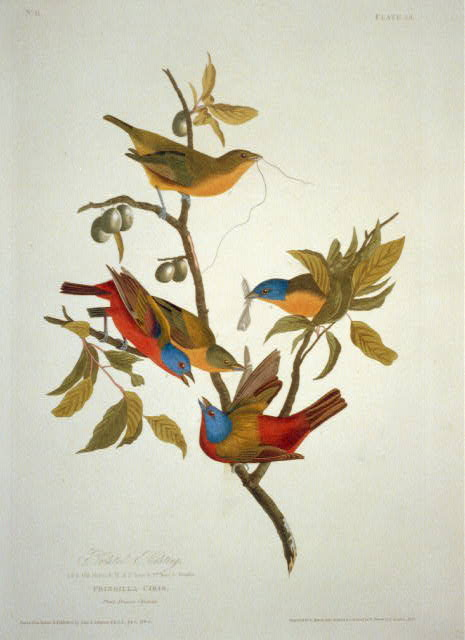
Painted Bunting from The Birds of America

Xanthic morph from Florida
