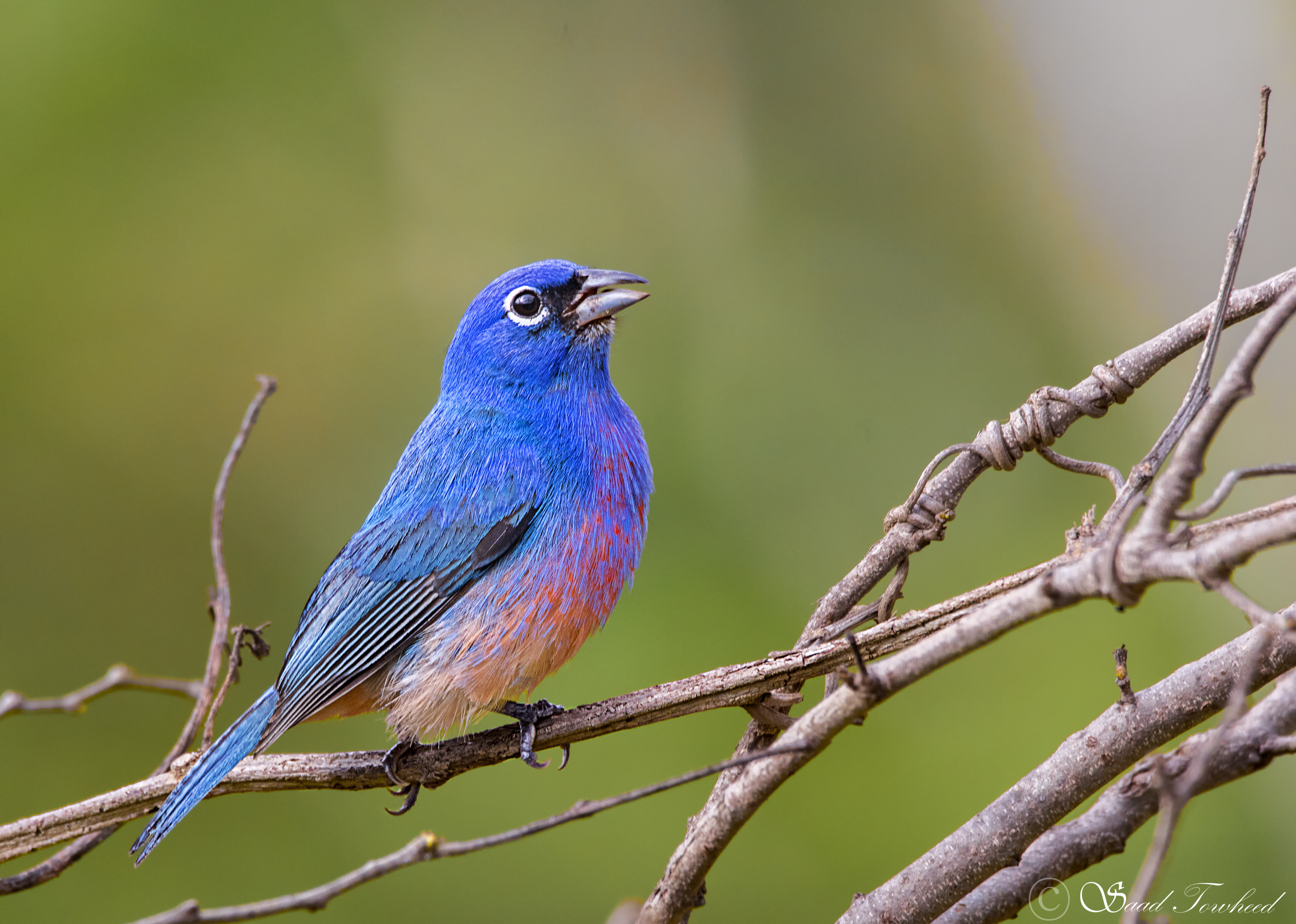

Conservation status
- Near Threatened (IUCN 3.1)

Scientific classification
- Kingdom: Animalia
- Phylum: Chordata
- Class: Aves
- Order: Passeriformes
- Family: Cardinalidae
- Genus: Passerina
- Species: P. rositae

Binomial name
- Passerina rositae (Lawrence, 1874)
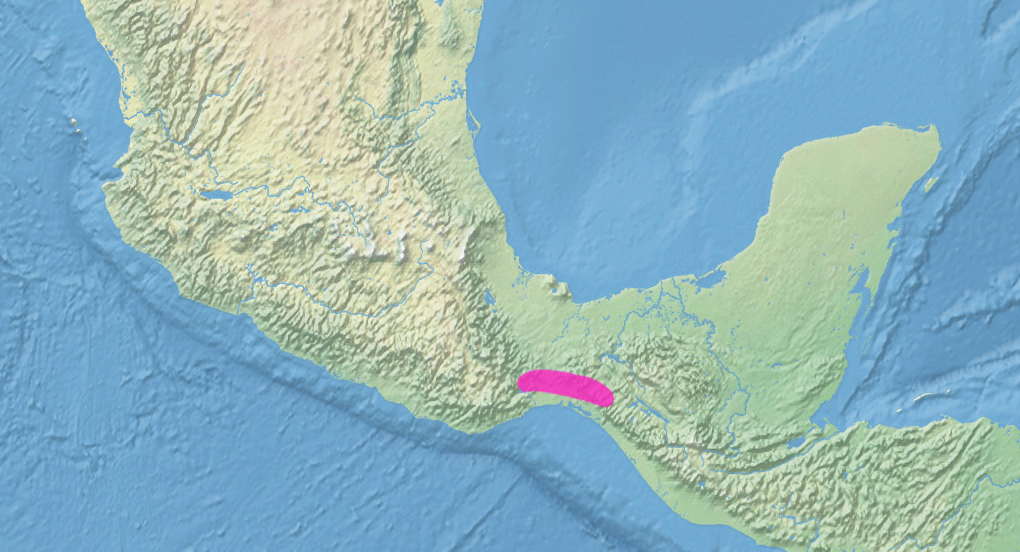
- Range of the rose-bellied bunting

= Rose-bellied bunting =

Species of bird

The rose-bellied bunting or Rosita's bunting (Passerina rositae) is a species of bird in the family Cardinalidae, the cardinals or cardinal grosbeaks. It is endemic to a very small area of southern Mexico.

== Taxonomy and systematics ==
The rose-bellied bunting is monotypic.

== Description ==
The rose-bellied bunting is 13.5 to 14.5 cm (5.3 to 5.7 in) long and weighs 19.5 to 20.5 g (0.69 to 0.72 oz). The adult male's crown is purplish-blue, and it is electric blue on the rest of its upperparts that fades from darker to lighter towards the tail. Its chin is grayish, the throat and chest blue, and the belly and vent area salmon pink. The adult female's head and upperparts are gray-brown with a bluish tinge at the rump. Its undersides are pinkish buff, warmer on the throat becoming paler towards the lower belly.

== Distribution and habitat ==
The rose-bellied bunting's core range is a narrow strip along the Pacific slope of the Isthmus of Tehuantepec in eastern Oaxaca and western Chiapas. There is one additional record further east in Chiapas, in El Triunfo Biosphere Reserve. It inhabits arid to semiarid thorn forest, moister gallery forest, and swamp forest. In elevation it ranges from 180 to 800 m (590 to 2,620 ft).

== Behavior ==
=== Feeding ===
The rose-bellied bunting forages alone or in pairs in the lower to mid-level of its habitat. Its diet consists of seeding grasses and fruit from trees and bushes.

=== Breeding ===
Two rose-bellied bunting nests have been described. One found in late July had freshly laid eggs, the other had eggs well along in incubation in late June. The nests were open cups of dead leaves and bark lined with finer material; they were placed in crotches of small saplings. One clutch had three eggs and the other four. No other information about the species' breeding phenology has been published.

=== Vocalization ===
The rose-bellied bunting's song is "a sweet, slightly burry warble" . Its call is "a wet 'plik' or 'plek'" .

== Status ==
The IUCN has assessed the rose-bellied bunting as Near Threatened "because it has a small range, which may be in decline owing to habitat degradation and infrastructure development."
